This is a partial list of unnumbered minor planets for principal provisional designations assigned between 1 May and 31 July 2004. , a total of 463 bodies remain unnumbered for this period. Objects for this year are listed on the following pages: A–B · C · D–E · F · G–H · J–O · P–Q · Ri · Rii · Riii · S · Ti · Tii · Tiii · Tiv · U–V · W–X and Y. Also see previous and next year.

J 

|- id="2004 JB" bgcolor=#FFC2E0
| 6 || 2004 JB || AMO || 22.5 || data-sort-value="0.11" | 110 m || single || 29 days || 30 May 2004 || 25 || align=left | — || 
|- id="2004 JC" bgcolor=#FFC2E0
| 7 || 2004 JC || APO || 20.5 || data-sort-value="0.28" | 280 m || single || 21 days || 29 May 2004 || 55 || align=left | — || 
|- id="2004 JM" bgcolor=#d6d6d6
| 0 || 2004 JM || MBA-O || 16.5 || 2.8 km || multiple || 2004–2020 || 18 May 2020 || 151 || align=left | Alt.: 2015 HM165 || 
|- id="2004 JN1" bgcolor=#FFC2E0
| 2 ||  || APO || 23.7 || data-sort-value="0.065" | 65 m || multiple || 2004–2021 || 15 Jun 2021 || 104 || align=left | — || 
|- id="2004 JO1" bgcolor=#FFC2E0
| 8 ||  || APO || 20.9 || data-sort-value="0.23" | 230 m || single || 20 days || 30 May 2004 || 124 || align=left | — || 
|- id="2004 JP1" bgcolor=#FFC2E0
| 2 ||  || APO || 22.7 || data-sort-value="0.10" | 100 m || multiple || 2004–2016 || 23 Nov 2016 || 184 || align=left | — || 
|- id="2004 JR1" bgcolor=#FFC2E0
| 0 ||  || AMO || 17.5 || 1.1 km || multiple || 1999–2019 || 24 Dec 2019 || 529 || align=left | NEO larger than 1 kilometerAlt.: 1999 LL4 || 
|- id="2004 JM2" bgcolor=#fefefe
| 1 ||  || MBA-I || 18.9 || data-sort-value="0.49" | 490 m || multiple || 2004–2015 || 08 Sep 2015 || 33 || align=left | Alt.: 2011 GX17 || 
|- id="2004 JU2" bgcolor=#fefefe
| 2 ||  || MBA-I || 19.25 || data-sort-value="0.42" | 420 m || multiple || 2004–2019 || 02 Apr 2019 || 21 || align=left | Disc.: LPL/Spacewatch IIAdded on 17 June 2021Alt.: 2015 AD223 || 
|- id="2004 JY3" bgcolor=#fefefe
| – ||  || MBA-I || 19.5 || data-sort-value="0.37" | 370 m || single || 14 days || 23 May 2004 || 9 || align=left | — || 
|- id="2004 JZ3" bgcolor=#E9E9E9
| 0 ||  || MBA-M || 18.88 || data-sort-value="0.70" | 700 m || multiple || 2004–2021 || 11 Jun 2021 || 194 || align=left | Disc.: LPL/Spacewatch IIAdded on 21 August 2021Alt.: 2021 GY98 || 
|- id="2004 JK7" bgcolor=#fefefe
| 0 ||  || MBA-I || 18.3 || data-sort-value="0.65" | 650 m || multiple || 2004–2021 || 19 Mar 2021 || 43 || align=left | Disc.: LPL/Spacewatch IIAdded on 17 June 2021 || 
|- id="2004 JW7" bgcolor=#fefefe
| 0 ||  || MBA-I || 18.6 || data-sort-value="0.57" | 570 m || multiple || 2001–2019 || 03 Oct 2019 || 66 || align=left | — || 
|- id="2004 JK9" bgcolor=#d6d6d6
| 0 ||  || MBA-O || 16.2 || 3.2 km || multiple || 1995–2020 || 25 May 2020 || 152 || align=left | Alt.: 2009 HZ71 || 
|- id="2004 JM9" bgcolor=#fefefe
| 0 ||  || MBA-I || 18.2 || data-sort-value="0.68" | 680 m || multiple || 1998–2021 || 07 Jun 2021 || 133 || align=left | Alt.: 2007 DP6, 2015 TJ155 || 
|- id="2004 JO9" bgcolor=#E9E9E9
| 0 ||  || MBA-M || 17.99 || data-sort-value="0.75" | 750 m || multiple || 2004–2021 || 16 Jun 2021 || 55 || align=left | — || 
|- id="2004 JP9" bgcolor=#E9E9E9
| 2 ||  || MBA-M || 17.6 || 1.3 km || multiple || 2004–2021 || 09 Jun 2021 || 24 || align=left | Disc.: LPL/Spacewatch IIAdded on 17 June 2021 || 
|- id="2004 JU9" bgcolor=#fefefe
| 0 ||  || MBA-I || 18.2 || data-sort-value="0.68" | 680 m || multiple || 2004–2019 || 28 Nov 2019 || 90 || align=left | — || 
|- id="2004 JE10" bgcolor=#E9E9E9
| 0 ||  || MBA-M || 16.5 || 2.8 km || multiple || 1995–2021 || 17 Jan 2021 || 151 || align=left | Alt.: 2013 KZ17 || 
|- id="2004 JL10" bgcolor=#fefefe
| 1 ||  || MBA-I || 17.8 || data-sort-value="0.82" | 820 m || multiple || 2004–2019 || 06 Sep 2019 || 64 || align=left | Alt.: 2015 LF17 || 
|- id="2004 JO12" bgcolor=#FFC2E0
| 7 ||  || AMO || 23.8 || data-sort-value="0.062" | 62 m || single || 9 days || 23 May 2004 || 54 || align=left | — || 
|- id="2004 JP12" bgcolor=#FFC2E0
| 8 ||  || APO || 23.4 || data-sort-value="0.074" | 74 m || single || 8 days || 20 May 2004 || 19 || align=left | — || 
|- id="2004 JH13" bgcolor=#FA8072
| 0 ||  || MCA || 17.83 || 1.1 km || multiple || 2004–2021 || 02 Dec 2021 || 83 || align=left | — || 
|- id="2004 JK13" bgcolor=#E9E9E9
| 0 ||  || MBA-M || 16.70 || 1.9 km || multiple || 2004–2021 || 17 May 2021 || 154 || align=left | Alt.: 2015 XO176 || 
|- id="2004 JT13" bgcolor=#E9E9E9
| 0 ||  || MBA-M || 16.88 || 1.8 km || multiple || 2001–2021 || 13 Jun 2021 || 217 || align=left | — || 
|- id="2004 JL17" bgcolor=#fefefe
| 0 ||  || MBA-I || 17.3 || 1.0 km || multiple || 2000–2021 || 05 Jan 2021 || 130 || align=left | Alt.: 2011 HA82 || 
|- id="2004 JO20" bgcolor=#FFC2E0
| 5 ||  || APO || 26.2 || data-sort-value="0.020" | 20 m || single || 3 days || 17 May 2004 || 35 || align=left | — || 
|- id="2004 JU20" bgcolor=#FFC2E0
| 8 ||  || AMO || 25.3 || data-sort-value="0.031" | 31 m || single || 3 days || 16 May 2004 || 8 || align=left | — || 
|- id="2004 JV20" bgcolor=#FFC2E0
| 8 ||  || APO || 24.0 || data-sort-value="0.056" | 56 m || single || 2 days || 17 May 2004 || 22 || align=left | — || 
|- id="2004 JX22" bgcolor=#E9E9E9
| 0 ||  || MBA-M || 16.6 || 2.7 km || multiple || 2004–2021 || 13 Jan 2021 || 67 || align=left | — || 
|- id="2004 JA23" bgcolor=#E9E9E9
| 0 ||  || MBA-M || 17.91 || 1.1 km || multiple || 2004–2021 || 02 Jun 2021 || 77 || align=left | — || 
|- id="2004 JL24" bgcolor=#d6d6d6
| 0 ||  || MBA-O || 15.55 || 4.3 km || multiple || 2004–2021 || 30 Jul 2021 || 206 || align=left | Alt.: 2006 TS58, 2010 ET187, 2012 UH119 || 
|- id="2004 JS28" bgcolor=#E9E9E9
| 0 ||  || MBA-M || 16.34 || 3.0 km || multiple || 2004–2022 || 27 Jan 2022 || 162 || align=left | Alt.: 2015 WE11 || 
|- id="2004 JW29" bgcolor=#FA8072
| 1 ||  || MCA || 18.9 || data-sort-value="0.49" | 490 m || multiple || 2001–2020 || 14 Oct 2020 || 74 || align=left | Alt.: 2017 SE18 || 
|- id="2004 JN33" bgcolor=#fefefe
| 0 ||  || MBA-I || 17.9 || data-sort-value="0.78" | 780 m || multiple || 1997–2020 || 22 Dec 2020 || 135 || align=left | Alt.: 2015 RU119 || 
|- id="2004 JH37" bgcolor=#E9E9E9
| 0 ||  || MBA-M || 17.38 || data-sort-value="0.99" | 990 m || multiple || 2004–2021 || 30 Oct 2021 || 83 || align=left | Alt.: 2008 JK1 || 
|- id="2004 JM37" bgcolor=#d6d6d6
| 0 ||  || MBA-O || 16.0 || 3.5 km || multiple || 2003–2020 || 19 May 2020 || 162 || align=left | — || 
|- id="2004 JO37" bgcolor=#E9E9E9
| 0 ||  || MBA-M || 17.3 || 1.5 km || multiple || 2004–2021 || 01 Jun 2021 || 79 || align=left | — || 
|- id="2004 JR37" bgcolor=#E9E9E9
| 1 ||  || MBA-M || 17.78 || 1.5 km || multiple || 2004–2017 || 03 Feb 2017 || 20 || align=left | — || 
|- id="2004 JS37" bgcolor=#d6d6d6
| 0 ||  || MBA-O || 16.56 || 2.7 km || multiple || 2004–2021 || 31 Oct 2021 || 141 || align=left | —Added on 22 July 2020 || 
|- id="2004 JV37" bgcolor=#E9E9E9
| 0 ||  || MBA-M || 16.83 || 1.8 km || multiple || 2004–2021 || 04 May 2021 || 195 || align=left | Alt.: 2017 EN5 || 
|- id="2004 JO38" bgcolor=#E9E9E9
| 0 ||  || MBA-M || 16.75 || 1.9 km || multiple || 2004–2021 || 07 Jul 2021 || 148 || align=left | — || 
|- id="2004 JV38" bgcolor=#E9E9E9
| 0 ||  || MBA-M || 17.18 || 1.5 km || multiple || 2004–2021 || 19 Apr 2021 || 105 || align=left | — || 
|- id="2004 JW38" bgcolor=#E9E9E9
| 1 ||  || MBA-M || 17.4 || 1.8 km || multiple || 2004–2017 || 27 Feb 2017 || 32 || align=left | — || 
|- id="2004 JZ38" bgcolor=#FA8072
| 3 ||  || MCA || 19.1 || data-sort-value="0.45" | 450 m || multiple || 2004–2021 || 21 Jun 2021 || 34 || align=left | — || 
|- id="2004 JH39" bgcolor=#d6d6d6
| 2 ||  || MBA-O || 17.2 || 2.0 km || multiple || 2004–2021 || 10 May 2021 || 33 || align=left | Disc.: SpacewatchAdded on 17 June 2021 || 
|- id="2004 JJ39" bgcolor=#E9E9E9
| 0 ||  || MBA-M || 17.5 || 1.8 km || multiple || 2000–2021 || 18 Jan 2021 || 42 || align=left | Disc.: SpacewatchAdded on 21 August 2021 || 
|- id="2004 JW39" bgcolor=#fefefe
| 1 ||  || MBA-I || 17.3 || 1.0 km || multiple || 2004–2021 || 04 Jan 2021 || 53 || align=left | Alt.: 2005 UP506 || 
|- id="2004 JJ40" bgcolor=#E9E9E9
| 1 ||  || MBA-M || 17.7 || data-sort-value="0.86" | 860 m || multiple || 2004–2020 || 20 May 2020 || 69 || align=left | Alt.: 2008 KB41 || 
|- id="2004 JO40" bgcolor=#fefefe
| 2 ||  || MBA-I || 18.0 || data-sort-value="0.75" | 750 m || multiple || 2004–2020 || 14 Oct 2020 || 72 || align=left | — || 
|- id="2004 JW40" bgcolor=#d6d6d6
| 0 ||  || MBA-O || 17.27 || 2.0 km || multiple || 2004–2021 || 10 Nov 2021 || 73 || align=left | Disc.: SpacewatchAdded on 5 November 2021 || 
|- id="2004 JX40" bgcolor=#fefefe
| 0 ||  || HUN || 18.4 || data-sort-value="0.62" | 620 m || multiple || 1997–2020 || 12 Dec 2020 || 125 || align=left | Alt.: 2015 VG132 || 
|- id="2004 JS41" bgcolor=#E9E9E9
| 0 ||  || MBA-M || 16.45 || 2.2 km || multiple || 2000–2021 || 18 Apr 2021 || 149 || align=left | Alt.: 2014 UM210, 2016 AS134 || 
|- id="2004 JN43" bgcolor=#E9E9E9
| 0 ||  || MBA-M || 17.0 || 1.7 km || multiple || 2004–2021 || 12 Jan 2021 || 67 || align=left | — || 
|- id="2004 JL46" bgcolor=#fefefe
| 0 ||  || MBA-I || 17.7 || data-sort-value="0.86" | 860 m || multiple || 2004–2020 || 14 Nov 2020 || 86 || align=left | Alt.: 2015 KU142 || 
|- id="2004 JU46" bgcolor=#E9E9E9
| 0 ||  || MBA-M || 16.71 || 1.9 km || multiple || 2004–2021 || 12 May 2021 || 219 || align=left | Alt.: 2010 TP129, 2015 YH12 || 
|- id="2004 JU47" bgcolor=#E9E9E9
| 0 ||  || MBA-M || 16.9 || 2.3 km || multiple || 2004–2021 || 17 Jan 2021 || 85 || align=left | — || 
|- id="2004 JF48" bgcolor=#fefefe
| 0 ||  || MBA-I || 18.8 || data-sort-value="0.52" | 520 m || multiple || 2004–2019 || 24 Aug 2019 || 40 || align=left | — || 
|- id="2004 JH48" bgcolor=#d6d6d6
| 1 ||  || MBA-O || 17.0 || 2.2 km || multiple || 2004–2020 || 24 Jun 2020 || 48 || align=left | —Added on 22 July 2020 || 
|- id="2004 JM48" bgcolor=#fefefe
| 0 ||  || MBA-I || 19.0 || data-sort-value="0.47" | 470 m || multiple || 2004–2020 || 16 Jun 2020 || 39 || align=left | Alt.: 2007 HU29 || 
|- id="2004 JN48" bgcolor=#fefefe
| 0 ||  || MBA-I || 17.97 || data-sort-value="0.76" | 760 m || multiple || 2004–2021 || 03 May 2021 || 91 || align=left | Alt.: 2015 PF276 || 
|- id="2004 JO48" bgcolor=#E9E9E9
| 0 ||  || MBA-M || 17.3 || 1.9 km || multiple || 2004–2019 || 01 Nov 2019 || 70 || align=left | — || 
|- id="2004 JP48" bgcolor=#fefefe
| 1 ||  || MBA-I || 18.8 || data-sort-value="0.52" | 520 m || multiple || 2002–2018 || 19 May 2018 || 49 || align=left | Alt.: 2015 PQ198 || 
|- id="2004 JQ48" bgcolor=#E9E9E9
| 0 ||  || MBA-M || 17.49 || 1.3 km || multiple || 2004–2021 || 03 Apr 2021 || 112 || align=left | Alt.: 2010 VV154, 2013 LE13, 2014 ST253 || 
|- id="2004 JH49" bgcolor=#fefefe
| 0 ||  || MBA-I || 18.5 || data-sort-value="0.59" | 590 m || multiple || 2004–2020 || 20 Oct 2020 || 43 || align=left | Disc.: SpacewatchAdded on 19 October 2020 || 
|- id="2004 JR49" bgcolor=#fefefe
| 0 ||  || MBA-I || 18.4 || data-sort-value="0.62" | 620 m || multiple || 1994–2019 || 02 Nov 2019 || 50 || align=left | — || 
|- id="2004 JJ51" bgcolor=#fefefe
| 0 ||  || MBA-I || 17.99 || data-sort-value="0.75" | 750 m || multiple || 2004–2021 || 02 May 2021 || 113 || align=left | — || 
|- id="2004 JL53" bgcolor=#E9E9E9
| 3 ||  || MBA-M || 17.6 || data-sort-value="0.90" | 900 m || multiple || 2004–2017 || 18 Sep 2017 || 24 || align=left | — || 
|- id="2004 JQ53" bgcolor=#d6d6d6
| 0 ||  || MBA-O || 17.0 || 2.2 km || multiple || 2004–2020 || 21 Sep 2020 || 79 || align=left | Alt.: 2006 VR41 || 
|- id="2004 JU53" bgcolor=#E9E9E9
| 0 ||  || MBA-M || 16.4 || 2.2 km || multiple || 2001–2021 || 10 Jun 2021 || 168 || align=left | Alt.: 2014 WV252, 2017 KQ26 || 
|- id="2004 JB54" bgcolor=#d6d6d6
| 0 ||  || MBA-O || 15.7 || 4.0 km || multiple || 2004–2021 || 11 Jun 2021 || 153 || align=left | — || 
|- id="2004 JT54" bgcolor=#fefefe
| 3 ||  || HUN || 19.3 || data-sort-value="0.41" | 410 m || multiple || 2004–2020 || 23 Oct 2020 || 51 || align=left | Disc.: SpacewatchAdded on 21 August 2021Alt.: 2015 WD1 || 
|- id="2004 JB55" bgcolor=#E9E9E9
| 0 ||  || MBA-M || 17.73 || 1.2 km || multiple || 2004–2021 || 08 Apr 2021 || 95 || align=left | Alt.: 2017 HF19 || 
|- id="2004 JH56" bgcolor=#d6d6d6
| 0 ||  || MBA-O || 16.83 || 2.7 km || multiple || 2004–2021 || 16 Apr 2021 || 40 || align=left | Alt.: 2010 DV16 || 
|- id="2004 JK56" bgcolor=#fefefe
| 0 ||  || HUN || 18.4 || data-sort-value="0.62" | 620 m || multiple || 1996–2020 || 16 Oct 2020 || 154 || align=left | — || 
|- id="2004 JL56" bgcolor=#d6d6d6
| 0 ||  || MBA-O || 16.5 || 2.8 km || multiple || 2004–2020 || 20 Apr 2020 || 67 || align=left | Alt.: 2013 YE102 || 
|- id="2004 JT56" bgcolor=#E9E9E9
| 0 ||  || MBA-M || 16.34 || 2.3 km || multiple || 1998–2021 || 18 May 2021 || 217 || align=left | — || 
|- id="2004 JV56" bgcolor=#fefefe
| 0 ||  || MBA-I || 18.33 || data-sort-value="0.64" | 640 m || multiple || 2004–2022 || 07 Jan 2022 || 93 || align=left | — || 
|- id="2004 JW56" bgcolor=#fefefe
| 0 ||  || MBA-I || 18.02 || data-sort-value="0.74" | 740 m || multiple || 2004–2022 || 26 Jan 2022 || 122 || align=left | — || 
|- id="2004 JX56" bgcolor=#d6d6d6
| 0 ||  || MBA-O || 16.36 || 3.0 km || multiple || 2004–2021 || 05 Jun 2021 || 102 || align=left | — || 
|- id="2004 JY56" bgcolor=#fefefe
| 0 ||  || MBA-I || 17.9 || data-sort-value="0.78" | 780 m || multiple || 2004–2020 || 06 Dec 2020 || 140 || align=left | — || 
|- id="2004 JZ56" bgcolor=#d6d6d6
| 0 ||  || MBA-O || 16.5 || 2.8 km || multiple || 2004–2020 || 20 Apr 2020 || 67 || align=left | — || 
|- id="2004 JC57" bgcolor=#E9E9E9
| 1 ||  || MBA-M || 16.8 || 1.8 km || multiple || 2004–2021 || 24 Jan 2021 || 74 || align=left | — || 
|- id="2004 JD57" bgcolor=#FA8072
| 0 ||  || MCA || 18.9 || data-sort-value="0.49" | 490 m || multiple || 2004–2020 || 22 Apr 2020 || 58 || align=left | — || 
|- id="2004 JE57" bgcolor=#fefefe
| 0 ||  || MBA-I || 18.8 || data-sort-value="0.52" | 520 m || multiple || 2004–2020 || 21 Jul 2020 || 100 || align=left | — || 
|- id="2004 JG57" bgcolor=#fefefe
| 0 ||  || MBA-I || 17.8 || data-sort-value="0.82" | 820 m || multiple || 2004–2019 || 28 Nov 2019 || 79 || align=left | — || 
|- id="2004 JH57" bgcolor=#fefefe
| 0 ||  || MBA-I || 18.5 || data-sort-value="0.59" | 590 m || multiple || 2004–2019 || 02 Jan 2019 || 43 || align=left | — || 
|- id="2004 JK57" bgcolor=#fefefe
| 0 ||  || MBA-I || 18.0 || data-sort-value="0.75" | 750 m || multiple || 2004–2020 || 07 Dec 2020 || 64 || align=left | — || 
|- id="2004 JL57" bgcolor=#d6d6d6
| 0 ||  || MBA-O || 16.30 || 3.1 km || multiple || 2004–2021 || 30 May 2021 || 57 || align=left | — || 
|- id="2004 JM57" bgcolor=#fefefe
| 0 ||  || MBA-I || 18.8 || data-sort-value="0.52" | 520 m || multiple || 2004–2020 || 11 Jul 2020 || 53 || align=left | — || 
|- id="2004 JN57" bgcolor=#fefefe
| 2 ||  || MBA-I || 19.0 || data-sort-value="0.47" | 470 m || multiple || 2004–2018 || 23 Apr 2018 || 35 || align=left | — || 
|- id="2004 JO57" bgcolor=#E9E9E9
| 0 ||  || MBA-M || 17.09 || 1.6 km || multiple || 2004–2021 || 07 May 2021 || 80 || align=left | — || 
|- id="2004 JQ57" bgcolor=#E9E9E9
| 0 ||  || MBA-M || 18.32 || data-sort-value="0.91" | 910 m || multiple || 2004–2021 || 30 Jul 2021 || 69 || align=left | — || 
|- id="2004 JR57" bgcolor=#fefefe
| 0 ||  || MBA-I || 18.2 || data-sort-value="0.68" | 680 m || multiple || 2004–2016 || 05 Dec 2016 || 32 || align=left | — || 
|- id="2004 JT57" bgcolor=#d6d6d6
| 0 ||  || MBA-O || 16.77 || 2.5 km || multiple || 2004–2021 || 08 Sep 2021 || 92 || align=left | — || 
|- id="2004 JU57" bgcolor=#fefefe
| 0 ||  || MBA-I || 18.1 || data-sort-value="0.71" | 710 m || multiple || 2004–2019 || 26 Nov 2019 || 63 || align=left | — || 
|- id="2004 JV57" bgcolor=#fefefe
| 0 ||  || MBA-I || 18.1 || data-sort-value="0.71" | 710 m || multiple || 2004–2019 || 27 Oct 2019 || 53 || align=left | — || 
|- id="2004 JX57" bgcolor=#fefefe
| 0 ||  || MBA-I || 18.2 || data-sort-value="0.68" | 680 m || multiple || 2004–2020 || 10 Oct 2020 || 70 || align=left | — || 
|- id="2004 JZ57" bgcolor=#fefefe
| 0 ||  || HUN || 18.7 || data-sort-value="0.54" | 540 m || multiple || 2004–2020 || 25 Jan 2020 || 38 || align=left | — || 
|- id="2004 JC58" bgcolor=#fefefe
| 0 ||  || MBA-I || 18.5 || data-sort-value="0.59" | 590 m || multiple || 2004–2019 || 28 Aug 2019 || 86 || align=left | Alt.: 2016 UA169 || 
|- id="2004 JD58" bgcolor=#fefefe
| 0 ||  || MBA-I || 18.38 || data-sort-value="0.63" | 630 m || multiple || 1997–2021 || 15 Apr 2021 || 85 || align=left | — || 
|- id="2004 JE58" bgcolor=#fefefe
| 0 ||  || MBA-I || 18.06 || data-sort-value="0.73" | 730 m || multiple || 2004–2021 || 12 May 2021 || 97 || align=left | — || 
|- id="2004 JF58" bgcolor=#E9E9E9
| 0 ||  || MBA-M || 17.4 || 1.8 km || multiple || 2004–2019 || 24 Dec 2019 || 52 || align=left | — || 
|- id="2004 JG58" bgcolor=#fefefe
| 0 ||  || MBA-I || 17.9 || data-sort-value="0.78" | 780 m || multiple || 2004–2020 || 21 Oct 2020 || 95 || align=left | — || 
|- id="2004 JH58" bgcolor=#d6d6d6
| 0 ||  || MBA-O || 16.1 || 3.4 km || multiple || 2004–2021 || 09 Jun 2021 || 78 || align=left | — || 
|- id="2004 JJ58" bgcolor=#d6d6d6
| 0 ||  || MBA-O || 16.85 || 2.4 km || multiple || 2004–2021 || 07 Jul 2021 || 79 || align=left | — || 
|- id="2004 JK58" bgcolor=#fefefe
| 0 ||  || MBA-I || 18.30 || data-sort-value="0.65" | 650 m || multiple || 2004–2021 || 07 May 2021 || 82 || align=left | — || 
|- id="2004 JL58" bgcolor=#d6d6d6
| 0 ||  || MBA-O || 16.16 || 3.3 km || multiple || 1995–2021 || 11 Jun 2021 || 122 || align=left | Alt.: 1995 VN5 || 
|- id="2004 JM58" bgcolor=#E9E9E9
| 0 ||  || MBA-M || 17.6 || data-sort-value="0.90" | 900 m || multiple || 2004–2020 || 21 Apr 2020 || 58 || align=left | — || 
|- id="2004 JN58" bgcolor=#fefefe
| 0 ||  || MBA-I || 18.6 || data-sort-value="0.57" | 570 m || multiple || 2004–2020 || 09 Dec 2020 || 34 || align=left | — || 
|- id="2004 JO58" bgcolor=#fefefe
| 0 ||  || MBA-I || 18.9 || data-sort-value="0.49" | 490 m || multiple || 2001–2018 || 17 Jun 2018 || 39 || align=left | Disc.: LPL/Spacewatch IIAdded on 19 October 2020 || 
|- id="2004 JP58" bgcolor=#d6d6d6
| 1 ||  || MBA-O || 16.5 || 2.8 km || multiple || 2004–2021 || 01 Jun 2021 || 74 || align=left | Disc.: SDSSAdded on 17 January 2021Alt.: 2010 DZ57 || 
|- id="2004 JQ58" bgcolor=#d6d6d6
| 0 ||  || MBA-O || 16.72 || 2.5 km || multiple || 2004–2021 || 11 May 2021 || 78 || align=left | Disc.: SpacewatchAdded on 9 March 2021 || 
|- id="2004 JR58" bgcolor=#d6d6d6
| 0 ||  || MBA-O || 17.43 || 1.8 km || multiple || 2004–2021 || 30 May 2021 || 40 || align=left | Disc.: LPL/Spacewatch IIAdded on 11 May 2021 || 
|- id="2004 JS58" bgcolor=#E9E9E9
| 0 ||  || MBA-M || 17.87 || 1.1 km || multiple || 2004–2021 || 30 Jun 2021 || 47 || align=left | Disc.: SpacewatchAdded on 17 June 2021 || 
|- id="2004 JU58" bgcolor=#E9E9E9
| 3 ||  || MBA-M || 18.0 || data-sort-value="0.75" | 750 m || multiple || 2004–2016 || 02 Mar 2016 || 17 || align=left | Disc.: SpacewatchAdded on 29 January 2022 || 
|}
back to top

K 

|- id="2004 KA" bgcolor=#FFC2E0
| 0 || 2004 KA || AMO || 21.02 || data-sort-value="0.22" | 220 m || multiple || 2004–2021 || 26 Oct 2021 || 267 || align=left | — || 
|- id="2004 KB" bgcolor=#FFC2E0
| 1 || 2004 KB || APO || 21.09 || data-sort-value="0.22" | 220 m || multiple || 2004–2021 || 29 Jul 2021 || 79 || align=left | Potentially hazardous object || 
|- id="2004 KZ" bgcolor=#FFC2E0
| 8 || 2004 KZ || APO || 25.5 || data-sort-value="0.028" | 28 m || single || 2 days || 20 May 2004 || 26 || align=left | — || 
|- id="2004 KF1" bgcolor=#FFC2E0
| 1 ||  || AMO || 20.8 || data-sort-value="0.25" | 250 m || multiple || 2004–2007 || 10 Mar 2007 || 101 || align=left | — || 
|- id="2004 KG1" bgcolor=#FFC2E0
| 7 ||  || ATE || 24.1 || data-sort-value="0.054" | 54 m || single || 10 days || 29 May 2004 || 100 || align=left | — || 
|- id="2004 KH1" bgcolor=#E9E9E9
| 1 ||  || MBA-M || 17.1 || 1.6 km || multiple || 2004–2020 || 27 Feb 2020 || 72 || align=left | Alt.: 2016 AB164 || 
|- id="2004 KZ1" bgcolor=#d6d6d6
| 0 ||  || MBA-O || 17.0 || 2.2 km || multiple || 2004–2021 || 11 Jun 2021 || 95 || align=left | — || 
|- id="2004 KR2" bgcolor=#E9E9E9
| 0 ||  || MBA-M || 18.14 || data-sort-value="0.99" | 990 m || multiple || 2004–2021 || 18 May 2021 || 51 || align=left | Disc.: SpacewatchAdded on 11 May 2021 || 
|- id="2004 KN3" bgcolor=#E9E9E9
| 0 ||  || MBA-M || 16.9 || 1.8 km || multiple || 2004–2021 || 12 Jun 2021 || 98 || align=left | Alt.: 2016 CK24 || 
|- id="2004 KF5" bgcolor=#FA8072
| 1 ||  || MCA || 18.7 || data-sort-value="0.54" | 540 m || multiple || 2004–2021 || 12 Jan 2021 || 174 || align=left | Alt.: 2007 TJ28 || 
|- id="2004 KO6" bgcolor=#fefefe
| 0 ||  || MBA-I || 18.0 || data-sort-value="0.75" | 750 m || multiple || 2000–2019 || 27 Oct 2019 || 93 || align=left | Alt.: 2011 KB21 || 
|- id="2004 KL7" bgcolor=#E9E9E9
| 0 ||  || MBA-M || 17.49 || 1.3 km || multiple || 2001–2021 || 03 May 2021 || 84 || align=left | —Added on 22 July 2020 || 
|- id="2004 KM8" bgcolor=#fefefe
| 0 ||  || MBA-I || 17.1 || 1.1 km || multiple || 1996–2021 || 07 Jan 2021 || 198 || align=left | Alt.: 2009 WD97, 2012 RG28 || 
|- id="2004 KN10" bgcolor=#FFC2E0
| 6 ||  || AMO || 23.6 || data-sort-value="0.068" | 68 m || single || 24 days || 14 Jun 2004 || 45 || align=left | — || 
|- id="2004 KC11" bgcolor=#E9E9E9
| 0 ||  || MBA-M || 17.71 || 1.2 km || multiple || 2004–2021 || 06 May 2021 || 58 || align=left | — || 
|- id="2004 KD11" bgcolor=#E9E9E9
| – ||  || MBA-M || 18.4 || data-sort-value="0.62" | 620 m || single || 9 days || 28 May 2004 || 9 || align=left | — || 
|- id="2004 KN11" bgcolor=#E9E9E9
| 0 ||  || MBA-M || 16.57 || 2.0 km || multiple || 2002–2021 || 19 Apr 2021 || 169 || align=left | Alt.: 2006 XF72 || 
|- id="2004 KZ14" bgcolor=#FFC2E0
| 1 ||  || AMO || 20.5 || data-sort-value="0.28" | 280 m || multiple || 2001–2021 || 08 Jan 2021 || 102 || align=left | — || 
|- id="2004 KF15" bgcolor=#FFC2E0
| 1 ||  || AMO || 20.7 || data-sort-value="0.26" | 260 m || multiple || 2004–2019 || 08 Oct 2019 || 119 || align=left | — || 
|- id="2004 KN15" bgcolor=#d6d6d6
| 0 ||  || MBA-O || 16.06 || 3.4 km || multiple || 2004–2021 || 03 Aug 2021 || 223 || align=left | — || 
|- id="2004 KZ15" bgcolor=#fefefe
| 0 ||  || MBA-I || 17.8 || data-sort-value="0.82" | 820 m || multiple || 2004–2020 || 18 Dec 2020 || 51 || align=left | Alt.: 2015 LM12 || 
|- id="2004 KE17" bgcolor=#FFC2E0
| 5 ||  || AMO || 21.5 || data-sort-value="0.18" | 180 m || single || 10 days || 07 Jun 2004 || 61 || align=left | Potentially hazardous object || 
|- id="2004 KF17" bgcolor=#FFC2E0
| 5 ||  || APO || 26.1 || data-sort-value="0.021" | 21 m || single || 3 days || 31 May 2004 || 41 || align=left | — || 
|- id="2004 KG17" bgcolor=#FFC2E0
| 7 ||  || AMO || 27.1 || data-sort-value="0.014" | 14 m || single || 6 days || 03 Jun 2004 || 13 || align=left | — || 
|- id="2004 KS17" bgcolor=#fefefe
| 0 ||  || HUN || 18.2 || data-sort-value="0.68" | 680 m || multiple || 2004–2020 || 22 Jun 2020 || 90 || align=left | Alt.: 2010 YA || 
|- id="2004 KT17" bgcolor=#fefefe
| 0 ||  || MBA-I || 17.3 || 1.0 km || multiple || 2004–2021 || 18 Jan 2021 || 137 || align=left | Alt.: 2011 JG11 || 
|- id="2004 KV18" bgcolor=#C2E0FF
| 2 ||  || TNO || 8.9 || 92 km || multiple || 2004–2016 || 29 May 2016 || 22 || align=left | LoUTNOs, centaur || 
|- id="2004 KZ18" bgcolor=#C2E0FF
| 2 ||  || TNO || 8.4 || 76 km || multiple || 2004–2015 || 12 Jun 2015 || 18 || align=left | LoUTNOs, res2:5 || 
|- id="2004 KB19" bgcolor=#C2E0FF
| 3 ||  || TNO || 7.4 || 114 km || multiple || 2004–2015 || 15 Apr 2015 || 19 || align=left | LoUTNOs, plutino, binary: 108 km || 
|- id="2004 KC19" bgcolor=#C2E0FF
| 2 ||  || TNO || 8.2 || 108 km || multiple || 2004–2016 || 29 May 2016 || 19 || align=left | LoUTNOs, plutino || 
|- id="2004 KD19" bgcolor=#C2E0FF
| 4 ||  || TNO || 7.4 || 138 km || multiple || 2004–2008 || 05 May 2008 || 14 || align=left | LoUTNOs, other TNO || 
|- id="2004 KE19" bgcolor=#C2E0FF
| 2 ||  || TNO || 6.4 || 174 km || multiple || 2004–2020 || 23 Jun 2020 || 25 || align=left | LoUTNOs, cubewano (cold), binary: 129 km || 
|- id="2004 KF19" bgcolor=#C2E0FF
| 2 ||  || TNO || 6.9 || 139 km || multiple || 2004–2016 || 08 Jun 2016 || 22 || align=left | LoUTNOs, cubewano (cold) || 
|- id="2004 KG19" bgcolor=#C2E0FF
| 3 ||  || TNO || 7.4 || 110 km || multiple || 2004–2015 || 15 Apr 2015 || 19 || align=left | LoUTNOs, cubewano (cold) || 
|- id="2004 KH19" bgcolor=#C2E0FF
| 3 ||  || TNO || 6.4 || 218 km || multiple || 2004–2016 || 08 Jun 2016 || 23 || align=left | LoUTNOs, other TNO, binary: 135 km || 
|- id="2004 KJ19" bgcolor=#C2E0FF
| 1 ||  || TNO || 7.1 || 158 km || multiple || 2004–2019 || 06 Jun 2019 || 83 || align=left | LoUTNOs, other TNO || 
|- id="2004 KK19" bgcolor=#C2E0FF
| 3 ||  || TNO || 7.2 || 125 km || multiple || 2004–2010 || 20 Mar 2010 || 24 || align=left | LoUTNOs, cubewano? || 
|- id="2004 KL19" bgcolor=#C2E0FF
| 3 ||  || TNO || 8.7 || 66 km || multiple || 2004–2008 || 05 May 2008 || 20 || align=left | LoUTNOs, twotino || 
|- id="2004 KM19" bgcolor=#C2E0FF
| 3 ||  || TNO || 8.2 || 83 km || multiple || 2004–2008 || 08 Jun 2008 || 18 || align=left | LoUTNOs, twotino || 
|- id="2004 KP19" bgcolor=#fefefe
| 0 ||  || MBA-I || 17.5 || data-sort-value="0.94" | 940 m || multiple || 2004–2021 || 17 Jan 2021 || 118 || align=left | — || 
|- id="2004 KR19" bgcolor=#E9E9E9
| 0 ||  || MBA-M || 17.0 || 1.7 km || multiple || 2004–2021 || 15 Jan 2021 || 87 || align=left | — || 
|- id="2004 KT19" bgcolor=#d6d6d6
| 0 ||  || MBA-O || 16.1 || 3.4 km || multiple || 2004–2021 || 08 Jun 2021 || 124 || align=left | — || 
|- id="2004 KU19" bgcolor=#E9E9E9
| 0 ||  || MBA-M || 17.4 || 1.4 km || multiple || 2004–2020 || 18 Apr 2020 || 125 || align=left | — || 
|- id="2004 KV19" bgcolor=#d6d6d6
| 0 ||  || MBA-O || 15.83 || 3.8 km || multiple || 2004–2021 || 06 May 2021 || 132 || align=left | — || 
|- id="2004 KX19" bgcolor=#fefefe
| 0 ||  || MBA-I || 17.6 || data-sort-value="0.90" | 900 m || multiple || 2004–2020 || 20 Oct 2020 || 107 || align=left | — || 
|- id="2004 KY19" bgcolor=#d6d6d6
| 0 ||  || MBA-O || 16.63 || 2.6 km || multiple || 2004–2021 || 31 Jul 2021 || 88 || align=left | — || 
|- id="2004 KZ19" bgcolor=#E9E9E9
| 0 ||  || MBA-M || 16.63 || 2.0 km || multiple || 2004–2021 || 18 May 2021 || 176 || align=left | — || 
|- id="2004 KA20" bgcolor=#d6d6d6
| 0 ||  || MBA-O || 15.8 || 3.9 km || multiple || 2003–2021 || 12 Jun 2021 || 156 || align=left | — || 
|- id="2004 KE20" bgcolor=#E9E9E9
| 0 ||  || MBA-M || 17.34 || 1.4 km || multiple || 2004–2021 || 18 Apr 2021 || 77 || align=left | — || 
|- id="2004 KG20" bgcolor=#fefefe
| 0 ||  || HUN || 18.6 || data-sort-value="0.57" | 570 m || multiple || 1994–2020 || 11 Jul 2020 || 56 || align=left | — || 
|- id="2004 KJ20" bgcolor=#d6d6d6
| 0 ||  || MBA-O || 16.6 || 2.7 km || multiple || 2004–2021 || 12 Jun 2021 || 59 || align=left | — || 
|- id="2004 KK20" bgcolor=#d6d6d6
| 0 ||  || MBA-O || 16.7 || 2.5 km || multiple || 2004–2020 || 19 May 2020 || 54 || align=left | — || 
|- id="2004 KL20" bgcolor=#d6d6d6
| 0 ||  || MBA-O || 15.9 || 3.7 km || multiple || 2004–2020 || 18 May 2020 || 70 || align=left | — || 
|- id="2004 KM20" bgcolor=#fefefe
| 0 ||  || MBA-I || 18.2 || data-sort-value="0.68" | 680 m || multiple || 2004–2019 || 02 Nov 2019 || 59 || align=left | — || 
|- id="2004 KN20" bgcolor=#d6d6d6
| 0 ||  || MBA-O || 16.1 || 3.4 km || multiple || 2004–2020 || 20 May 2020 || 65 || align=left | — || 
|- id="2004 KO20" bgcolor=#E9E9E9
| 1 ||  || MBA-M || 17.0 || 2.2 km || multiple || 2004–2021 || 17 Jan 2021 || 55 || align=left | — || 
|- id="2004 KP20" bgcolor=#E9E9E9
| 0 ||  || MBA-M || 17.90 || 1.1 km || multiple || 2004–2021 || 11 May 2021 || 57 || align=left | — || 
|- id="2004 KQ20" bgcolor=#fefefe
| 0 ||  || MBA-I || 18.05 || data-sort-value="0.73" | 730 m || multiple || 2004–2021 || 03 Aug 2021 || 105 || align=left | — || 
|- id="2004 KS20" bgcolor=#E9E9E9
| 0 ||  || MBA-M || 17.88 || 1.1 km || multiple || 2004–2021 || 07 Apr 2021 || 52 || align=left | — || 
|- id="2004 KU20" bgcolor=#E9E9E9
| 0 ||  || MBA-M || 17.6 || 1.3 km || multiple || 2004–2020 || 22 Mar 2020 || 43 || align=left | — || 
|- id="2004 KW20" bgcolor=#E9E9E9
| 0 ||  || MBA-M || 17.87 || 1.1 km || multiple || 2004–2021 || 06 Apr 2021 || 65 || align=left | — || 
|- id="2004 KX20" bgcolor=#d6d6d6
| 0 ||  || MBA-O || 16.47 || 2.8 km || multiple || 2004–2021 || 07 Jul 2021 || 63 || align=left | — || 
|- id="2004 KY20" bgcolor=#fefefe
| 0 ||  || HUN || 18.6 || data-sort-value="0.57" | 570 m || multiple || 2004–2018 || 14 Dec 2018 || 31 || align=left | — || 
|- id="2004 KZ20" bgcolor=#fefefe
| 0 ||  || MBA-I || 18.7 || data-sort-value="0.54" | 540 m || multiple || 2004–2019 || 24 Aug 2019 || 82 || align=left | — || 
|- id="2004 KA21" bgcolor=#d6d6d6
| 0 ||  || MBA-O || 16.41 || 2.9 km || multiple || 2004–2021 || 29 Aug 2021 || 73 || align=left | Alt.: 2010 FW117 || 
|- id="2004 KB21" bgcolor=#d6d6d6
| 0 ||  || MBA-O || 17.01 || 2.2 km || multiple || 2004–2021 || 24 Oct 2021 || 123 || align=left | Alt.: 2010 JE61 || 
|- id="2004 KC21" bgcolor=#E9E9E9
| 0 ||  || MBA-M || 17.05 || 1.6 km || multiple || 2004–2021 || 30 May 2021 || 121 || align=left | — || 
|- id="2004 KD21" bgcolor=#fefefe
| 0 ||  || MBA-I || 18.36 || data-sort-value="0.63" | 630 m || multiple || 2004–2022 || 27 Jan 2022 || 89 || align=left | — || 
|- id="2004 KE21" bgcolor=#E9E9E9
| 0 ||  || MBA-M || 17.3 || 1.9 km || multiple || 2004–2019 || 23 Oct 2019 || 67 || align=left | — || 
|- id="2004 KF21" bgcolor=#E9E9E9
| 0 ||  || MBA-M || 17.64 || 1.2 km || multiple || 2004–2021 || 15 Apr 2021 || 87 || align=left | — || 
|- id="2004 KG21" bgcolor=#E9E9E9
| 0 ||  || MBA-M || 17.0 || 2.2 km || multiple || 2004–2019 || 24 Dec 2019 || 69 || align=left | — || 
|- id="2004 KJ21" bgcolor=#E9E9E9
| 0 ||  || MBA-M || 17.1 || 2.1 km || multiple || 2004–2019 || 29 Nov 2019 || 52 || align=left | — || 
|- id="2004 KL21" bgcolor=#d6d6d6
| 1 ||  || MBA-O || 16.8 || 2.4 km || multiple || 2004–2020 || 23 Jul 2020 || 76 || align=left | — || 
|- id="2004 KM21" bgcolor=#d6d6d6
| 0 ||  || MBA-O || 16.64 || 2.6 km || multiple || 2004–2021 || 11 Jul 2021 || 102 || align=left | — || 
|- id="2004 KN21" bgcolor=#fefefe
| 0 ||  || MBA-I || 17.76 || data-sort-value="0.83" | 830 m || multiple || 2004–2021 || 07 Oct 2021 || 124 || align=left | — || 
|- id="2004 KP21" bgcolor=#E9E9E9
| 0 ||  || MBA-M || 17.4 || 1.8 km || multiple || 2004–2020 || 16 Nov 2020 || 46 || align=left | — || 
|- id="2004 KQ21" bgcolor=#d6d6d6
| 0 ||  || MBA-O || 16.0 || 3.5 km || multiple || 2004–2021 || 01 Jun 2021 || 73 || align=left | Alt.: 2010 EX157 || 
|- id="2004 KR21" bgcolor=#d6d6d6
| 0 ||  || MBA-O || 16.9 || 2.3 km || multiple || 2004–2020 || 22 Jun 2020 || 45 || align=left | — || 
|- id="2004 KS21" bgcolor=#fefefe
| 3 ||  || MBA-I || 18.1 || data-sort-value="0.71" | 710 m || multiple || 2004–2018 || 17 Jun 2018 || 29 || align=left | — || 
|- id="2004 KT21" bgcolor=#E9E9E9
| 2 ||  || MBA-M || 18.2 || data-sort-value="0.68" | 680 m || multiple || 2004–2020 || 27 Feb 2020 || 27 || align=left | — || 
|- id="2004 KV21" bgcolor=#E9E9E9
| 0 ||  || MBA-M || 17.39 || 1.4 km || multiple || 2004–2021 || 11 Apr 2021 || 91 || align=left | — || 
|- id="2004 KW21" bgcolor=#C2FFFF
| 0 ||  || JT || 14.20 || 8.0 km || multiple || 2004–2021 || 09 Dec 2021 || 177 || align=left | Greek camp (L4) || 
|- id="2004 KY21" bgcolor=#d6d6d6
| 0 ||  || MBA-O || 17.6 || 1.7 km || multiple || 2004–2019 || 03 Sep 2019 || 25 || align=left | — || 
|- id="2004 KZ21" bgcolor=#fefefe
| 0 ||  || MBA-I || 18.2 || data-sort-value="0.68" | 680 m || multiple || 2004–2019 || 27 Oct 2019 || 66 || align=left | — || 
|- id="2004 KA22" bgcolor=#E9E9E9
| 0 ||  || MBA-M || 17.04 || 1.6 km || multiple || 2004–2021 || 14 May 2021 || 82 || align=left | — || 
|- id="2004 KC22" bgcolor=#fefefe
| 0 ||  || MBA-I || 18.2 || data-sort-value="0.68" | 680 m || multiple || 2004–2019 || 27 Nov 2019 || 42 || align=left | — || 
|- id="2004 KD22" bgcolor=#fefefe
| 0 ||  || MBA-I || 17.07 || 1.1 km || multiple || 2004–2021 || 28 Nov 2021 || 140 || align=left | Alt.: 2010 EG147 || 
|- id="2004 KF22" bgcolor=#d6d6d6
| 0 ||  || MBA-O || 16.4 || 2.9 km || multiple || 2004–2020 || 16 May 2020 || 97 || align=left | — || 
|- id="2004 KG22" bgcolor=#d6d6d6
| 0 ||  || MBA-O || 16.77 || 2.5 km || multiple || 2004–2021 || 30 Nov 2021 || 44 || align=left | Disc.: SpacewatchAdded on 22 July 2020 || 
|- id="2004 KH22" bgcolor=#d6d6d6
| 0 ||  || HIL || 16.7 || 2.5 km || multiple || 2004–2015 || 09 Dec 2015 || 23 || align=left | Disc.: Pan-STARRSAdded on 22 July 2020 || 
|- id="2004 KJ22" bgcolor=#d6d6d6
| 0 ||  || MBA-O || 17.00 || 2.2 km || multiple || 2004–2021 || 05 Oct 2021 || 68 || align=left | Disc.: SpacewatchAdded on 13 September 2020 || 
|- id="2004 KK22" bgcolor=#C2FFFF
| 0 ||  || JT || 14.37 || 7.4 km || multiple || 2001–2021 || 29 Nov 2021 || 77 || align=left | Disc.: MLSAdded on 17 January 2021Greek camp (L4) || 
|- id="2004 KL22" bgcolor=#E9E9E9
| 0 ||  || MBA-M || 17.89 || 1.1 km || multiple || 2004–2021 || 06 Jun 2021 || 34 || align=left | Disc.: SpacewatchAdded on 5 November 2021 || 
|}
back to top

L 

|- id="2004 LA" bgcolor=#d6d6d6
| 0 || 2004 LA || MBA-O || 16.50 || 2.8 km || multiple || 2004–2021 || 07 Aug 2021 || 128 || align=left | Alt.: 2016 NW29 || 
|- id="2004 LB" bgcolor=#FFC2E0
| 2 || 2004 LB || APO || 21.6 || data-sort-value="0.17" | 170 m || multiple || 2004–2018 || 14 Jun 2018 || 157 || align=left | Potentially hazardous object || 
|- id="2004 LC" bgcolor=#FFC2E0
| 7 || 2004 LC || APO || 24.4 || data-sort-value="0.047" | 47 m || single || 7 days || 15 Jun 2004 || 79 || align=left | — || 
|- id="2004 LK" bgcolor=#FFC2E0
| 0 || 2004 LK || AMO || 22.7 || data-sort-value="0.10" | 100 m || multiple || 2004–2007 || 24 May 2007 || 67 || align=left | — || 
|- id="2004 LV" bgcolor=#FFC2E0
| 6 || 2004 LV || APO || 24.1 || data-sort-value="0.054" | 54 m || single || 3 days || 12 Jun 2004 || 21 || align=left | — || 
|- id="2004 LB1" bgcolor=#FFC2E0
| 5 ||  || APO || 23.2 || data-sort-value="0.081" | 81 m || single || 9 days || 19 Jun 2004 || 40 || align=left | — || 
|- id="2004 LB2" bgcolor=#FFC2E0
| 8 ||  || APO || 22.3 || data-sort-value="0.12" | 120 m || single || 4 days || 15 Jun 2004 || 54 || align=left | — || 
|- id="2004 LD2" bgcolor=#FFC2E0
| 5 ||  || AMO || 21.2 || data-sort-value="0.20" | 200 m || single || 32 days || 13 Jul 2004 || 57 || align=left | — || 
|- id="2004 LF2" bgcolor=#E9E9E9
| 0 ||  || MBA-M || 16.55 || 1.5 km || multiple || 2004–2021 || 31 Oct 2021 || 324 || align=left | Alt.: 2013 SO83 || 
|- id="2004 LO2" bgcolor=#FFC2E0
| 7 ||  || ATE || 25.0 || data-sort-value="0.036" | 36 m || single || 4 days || 15 Jun 2004 || 31 || align=left | — || 
|- id="2004 LU3" bgcolor=#FFC2E0
| 0 ||  || AMO || 18.4 || data-sort-value="0.74" | 740 m || multiple || 2004–2021 || 11 Jan 2021 || 780 || align=left | — || 
|- id="2004 LY3" bgcolor=#FA8072
| 0 ||  || MCA || 18.00 || data-sort-value="0.75" | 750 m || multiple || 1991–2021 || 11 Nov 2021 || 221 || align=left | Alt.: 1991 JL6, 1998 UT1 || 
|- id="2004 LX5" bgcolor=#FFC2E0
| 8 ||  || AMO || 25.6 || data-sort-value="0.027" | 27 m || single || 1 day || 13 Jun 2004 || 18 || align=left | — || 
|- id="2004 LY5" bgcolor=#FFC2E0
| 7 ||  || APO || 21.5 || data-sort-value="0.18" | 180 m || single || 3 days || 15 Jun 2004 || 37 || align=left | Potentially hazardous object || 
|- id="2004 LZ5" bgcolor=#FFC2E0
| 0 ||  || AMO || 18.43 || data-sort-value="0.73" | 730 m || multiple || 2004–2021 || 13 Sep 2021 || 90 || align=left | — || 
|- id="2004 LA6" bgcolor=#FFC2E0
| 6 ||  || AMO || 21.8 || data-sort-value="0.16" | 160 m || single || 41 days || 24 Jul 2004 || 43 || align=left | — || 
|- id="2004 LA10" bgcolor=#FFC2E0
| 5 ||  || AMO || 25.1 || data-sort-value="0.034" | 34 m || single || 14 days || 28 Jun 2004 || 52 || align=left | — || 
|- id="2004 LH10" bgcolor=#fefefe
| 0 ||  || MBA-I || 18.2 || data-sort-value="0.68" | 680 m || multiple || 2001–2019 || 22 Oct 2019 || 65 || align=left | — || 
|- id="2004 LJ10" bgcolor=#fefefe
| 0 ||  || MBA-I || 17.5 || data-sort-value="0.94" | 940 m || multiple || 2004–2021 || 17 Jan 2021 || 194 || align=left | Alt.: 2010 CD262, 2015 MM109 || 
|- id="2004 LY10" bgcolor=#E9E9E9
| 0 ||  || MBA-M || 16.0 || 3.5 km || multiple || 2004–2021 || 16 Jan 2021 || 103 || align=left | — || 
|- id="2004 LK12" bgcolor=#d6d6d6
| 0 ||  || MBA-O || 16.20 || 3.2 km || multiple || 2004–2022 || 27 Jan 2022 || 177 || align=left | Alt.: 2015 VQ116 || 
|- id="2004 LP12" bgcolor=#E9E9E9
| 0 ||  || MBA-M || 16.73 || 1.9 km || multiple || 1997–2021 || 13 May 2021 || 216 || align=left | Alt.: 2012 BL143, 2016 AD175 || 
|- id="2004 LU12" bgcolor=#fefefe
| 0 ||  || MBA-I || 18.39 || data-sort-value="0.62" | 620 m || multiple || 2004–2021 || 10 May 2021 || 70 || align=left | — || 
|- id="2004 LC14" bgcolor=#E9E9E9
| 0 ||  || MBA-M || 17.92 || data-sort-value="0.77" | 770 m || multiple || 2004–2021 || 30 Oct 2021 || 55 || align=left | — || 
|- id="2004 LF14" bgcolor=#E9E9E9
| 0 ||  || MBA-M || 17.98 || data-sort-value="0.75" | 750 m || multiple || 2004–2021 || 08 Nov 2021 || 69 || align=left | Disc.: SpacewatchAdded on 21 August 2021 || 
|- id="2004 LT14" bgcolor=#E9E9E9
| 0 ||  || MBA-M || 16.9 || 2.3 km || multiple || 2003–2021 || 15 Jan 2021 || 109 || align=left | Alt.: 2017 FX83 || 
|- id="2004 LN15" bgcolor=#fefefe
| 0 ||  || MBA-I || 18.01 || data-sort-value="0.74" | 740 m || multiple || 2004–2021 || 10 Apr 2021 || 50 || align=left | — || 
|- id="2004 LF18" bgcolor=#E9E9E9
| 0 ||  || MBA-M || 17.35 || 1.0 km || multiple || 2004–2021 || 28 Nov 2021 || 127 || align=left | — || 
|- id="2004 LH18" bgcolor=#FA8072
| 2 ||  || MCA || 19.8 || data-sort-value="0.61" | 610 m || multiple || 2004–2019 || 04 Aug 2019 || 43 || align=left | Alt.: 2019 MZ1 || 
|- id="2004 LQ18" bgcolor=#E9E9E9
| 0 ||  || MBA-M || 16.8 || 2.4 km || multiple || 2001–2021 || 08 Jan 2021 || 105 || align=left | — || 
|- id="2004 LR18" bgcolor=#E9E9E9
| 2 ||  || MBA-M || 17.6 || 1.7 km || multiple || 2004–2014 || 23 Nov 2014 || 31 || align=left | Alt.: 2014 WS244 || 
|- id="2004 LQ19" bgcolor=#fefefe
| 1 ||  || MBA-I || 18.4 || data-sort-value="0.62" | 620 m || multiple || 2004–2019 || 31 Oct 2019 || 41 || align=left | — || 
|- id="2004 LX19" bgcolor=#E9E9E9
| 0 ||  || MBA-M || 18.01 || data-sort-value="0.74" | 740 m || multiple || 2004–2021 || 06 Nov 2021 || 115 || align=left | — || 
|- id="2004 LW20" bgcolor=#E9E9E9
| 0 ||  || MBA-M || 16.51 || 2.8 km || multiple || 1995–2021 || 05 May 2021 || 224 || align=left | Alt.: 2017 HB10 || 
|- id="2004 LA21" bgcolor=#fefefe
| 0 ||  || HUN || 18.6 || data-sort-value="0.57" | 570 m || multiple || 2004–2020 || 29 May 2020 || 41 || align=left | — || 
|- id="2004 LT21" bgcolor=#E9E9E9
| 0 ||  || MBA-M || 17.51 || 1.3 km || multiple || 2004–2021 || 30 Oct 2021 || 152 || align=left | — || 
|- id="2004 LK22" bgcolor=#E9E9E9
| 0 ||  || MBA-M || 16.1 || 3.4 km || multiple || 2004–2021 || 17 Jan 2021 || 146 || align=left | — || 
|- id="2004 LR22" bgcolor=#d6d6d6
| 0 ||  || MBA-O || 16.78 || 2.5 km || multiple || 2004–2021 || 12 Nov 2021 || 128 || align=left | — || 
|- id="2004 LP23" bgcolor=#E9E9E9
| 0 ||  || MBA-M || 17.1 || 2.1 km || multiple || 2004–2021 || 09 Apr 2021 || 42 || align=left | Disc.: George Obs.Added on 11 May 2021Alt.: 2017 KT1 || 
|- id="2004 LA24" bgcolor=#fefefe
| 2 ||  || HUN || 18.8 || data-sort-value="0.52" | 520 m || multiple || 2004–2020 || 30 Jun 2020 || 20 || align=left | Disc.: SpacewatchAdded on 13 September 2020 || 
|- id="2004 LK27" bgcolor=#fefefe
| 0 ||  || MBA-I || 18.4 || data-sort-value="0.62" | 620 m || multiple || 2004–2020 || 17 Nov 2020 || 59 || align=left | — || 
|- id="2004 LN27" bgcolor=#E9E9E9
| 0 ||  || MBA-M || 16.4 || 2.9 km || multiple || 2000–2021 || 23 Jan 2021 || 150 || align=left | Alt.: 2012 CD38, 2014 QZ292 || 
|- id="2004 LA28" bgcolor=#E9E9E9
| 0 ||  || MBA-M || 17.75 || data-sort-value="0.84" | 840 m || multiple || 2004–2021 || 11 Sep 2021 || 68 || align=left | — || 
|- id="2004 LL28" bgcolor=#d6d6d6
| 0 ||  || MBA-O || 17.7 || 1.6 km || multiple || 2004–2020 || 19 Aug 2020 || 73 || align=left | — || 
|- id="2004 LQ28" bgcolor=#E9E9E9
| 0 ||  || MBA-M || 17.83 || data-sort-value="0.81" | 810 m || multiple || 2004–2021 || 09 Dec 2021 || 79 || align=left | Disc.: SpacewatchAdded on 9 March 2021Alt.: 2020 KK22 || 
|- id="2004 LX28" bgcolor=#E9E9E9
| 2 ||  || MBA-M || 17.6 || 1.3 km || multiple || 2004–2021 || 10 Sep 2021 || 29 || align=left | Disc.: SpacewatchAdded on 30 September 2021 || 
|- id="2004 LZ30" bgcolor=#d6d6d6
| 0 ||  || MBA-O || 16.39 || 2.9 km || multiple || 2004–2021 || 11 Jul 2021 || 85 || align=left | Alt.: 2010 FL118 || 
|- id="2004 LH31" bgcolor=#FA8072
| 0 ||  || MCA || 18.65 || data-sort-value="0.55" | 550 m || multiple || 1994–2021 || 09 Dec 2021 || 161 || align=left | — || 
|- id="2004 LR31" bgcolor=#C7FF8F
| 1 ||  || CEN || 9.10 || 84 km || multiple || 1999–2021 || 04 Oct 2021 || 247 || align=left | — || 
|- id="2004 LV31" bgcolor=#C2E0FF
| 3 ||  || TNO || 8.8 || 60 km || multiple || 2004–2005 || 03 Aug 2005 || 10 || align=left | LoUTNOs, cubewano? || 
|- id="2004 LW31" bgcolor=#C2E0FF
| 2 ||  || TNO || 7.0 || 132 km || multiple || 2004–2019 || 29 Jul 2019 || 39 || align=left | LoUTNOs, cubewano (cold) || 
|- id="2004 LY31" bgcolor=#E9E9E9
| 1 ||  || MBA-M || 16.9 || 1.8 km || multiple || 2004–2020 || 23 Apr 2020 || 136 || align=left | — || 
|- id="2004 LZ31" bgcolor=#fefefe
| 0 ||  || MBA-I || 18.0 || data-sort-value="0.75" | 750 m || multiple || 2004–2020 || 07 Dec 2020 || 105 || align=left | — || 
|- id="2004 LB32" bgcolor=#E9E9E9
| 0 ||  || MBA-M || 17.96 || 1.1 km || multiple || 2004–2021 || 10 May 2021 || 50 || align=left | — || 
|- id="2004 LD32" bgcolor=#d6d6d6
| 0 ||  || MBA-O || 17.01 || 2.2 km || multiple || 2004–2021 || 10 Aug 2021 || 60 || align=left | Alt.: 2010 NS6 || 
|- id="2004 LE32" bgcolor=#fefefe
| 0 ||  || HUN || 18.22 || data-sort-value="0.67" | 670 m || multiple || 2004–2022 || 13 Jan 2022 || 88 || align=left | — || 
|- id="2004 LH32" bgcolor=#fefefe
| 0 ||  || MBA-I || 18.0 || data-sort-value="0.75" | 750 m || multiple || 2004–2020 || 15 Oct 2020 || 78 || align=left | — || 
|- id="2004 LJ32" bgcolor=#E9E9E9
| 0 ||  || MBA-M || 16.79 || 2.4 km || multiple || 2004–2021 || 07 Apr 2021 || 130 || align=left | — || 
|- id="2004 LL32" bgcolor=#fefefe
| 0 ||  || MBA-I || 17.8 || data-sort-value="0.82" | 820 m || multiple || 2004–2021 || 15 Jan 2021 || 80 || align=left | — || 
|- id="2004 LN32" bgcolor=#E9E9E9
| 0 ||  || MBA-M || 17.6 || 1.7 km || multiple || 2004–2018 || 14 Aug 2018 || 46 || align=left | — || 
|- id="2004 LO32" bgcolor=#d6d6d6
| 0 ||  || MBA-O || 16.1 || 3.4 km || multiple || 2004–2021 || 08 Jun 2021 || 65 || align=left | — || 
|- id="2004 LP32" bgcolor=#E9E9E9
| 0 ||  || MBA-M || 17.6 || 1.3 km || multiple || 2004–2021 || 30 May 2021 || 49 || align=left | — || 
|- id="2004 LR32" bgcolor=#C2FFFF
| 0 ||  || JT || 14.47 || 7.1 km || multiple || 2004–2021 || 02 Dec 2021 || 112 || align=left | Greek camp (L4) || 
|- id="2004 LS32" bgcolor=#E9E9E9
| 0 ||  || MBA-M || 17.75 || 1.2 km || multiple || 2004–2021 || 06 Apr 2021 || 48 || align=left | — || 
|- id="2004 LT32" bgcolor=#C2E0FF
| 9 ||  || TNO || 6.89 || 158 km || multiple || 2004–2005 || 03 Aug 2005 || 12 || align=left | LoUTNOs, SDO || 
|- id="2004 LU32" bgcolor=#C2E0FF
| 9 ||  || TNO || 8.61 || 65 km || multiple || 2004–2005 || 03 Aug 2005 || 7 || align=left | —Added on 22 July 2020LoUTNOs, cubewano? || 
|- id="2004 LV32" bgcolor=#C2E0FF
| 9 ||  || TNO || 8.94 || 68 km || single || 37 days || 16 Jul 2004 || 8 || align=left | —Added on 22 July 2020LoUTNOs, other TNO || 
|- id="2004 LW32" bgcolor=#C2E0FF
| 9 ||  || TNO || 8.11 || 90 km || single || 37 days || 16 Jul 2004 || 8 || align=left | —Added on 22 July 2020LoUTNOs, SDO || 
|- id="2004 LX32" bgcolor=#C2E0FF
| 9 ||  || TNO || 8.23 || 126 km || single || 37 days || 16 Jul 2004 || 7 || align=left | —Added on 22 July 2020LoUTNOs, centaur || 
|- id="2004 LY32" bgcolor=#C2E0FF
| 9 ||  || TNO || 7.16 || 154 km || single || 36 days || 15 Jul 2004 || 7 || align=left | —Added on 22 July 2020LoUTNOs, other TNO || 
|- id="2004 LZ32" bgcolor=#C2E0FF
| 9 ||  || TNO || 7.91 || 109 km || single || 62 days || 10 Aug 2004 || 7 || align=left | —Added on 22 July 2020LoUTNOs, other TNO || 
|- id="2004 LA33" bgcolor=#C2E0FF
| E ||  || TNO || 8.6 || 123 km || single || 64 days || 12 Aug 2004 || 11 || align=left | —Added on 22 July 2020 || 
|- id="2004 LB33" bgcolor=#C2E0FF
| E ||  || TNO || 8.5 || 111 km || single || 2 days || 11 Jun 2004 || 5 || align=left | —Added on 22 July 2020LoUTNOs || 
|- id="2004 LC33" bgcolor=#C2E0FF
| E ||  || TNO || 7.9 || 109 km || single || 2 days || 11 Jun 2004 || 5 || align=left | —Added on 22 July 2020LoUTNOs, other TNO || 
|- id="2004 LD33" bgcolor=#C2E0FF
| E ||  || TNO || 8.5 || 94 km || single || 2 days || 11 Jun 2004 || 4 || align=left | —Added on 22 July 2020LoUTNOs, plutino? || 
|- id="2004 LE33" bgcolor=#C2E0FF
| 9 ||  || TNO || 8.77 || 98 km || single || 2 days || 11 Jun 2004 || 4 || align=left | —Added on 22 July 2020LoUTNOs, centaur || 
|- id="2004 LF33" bgcolor=#d6d6d6
| 0 ||  || MBA-O || 15.7 || 4.0 km || multiple || 2004–2021 || 06 Jun 2021 || 144 || align=left | Disc.: SpacewatchAdded on 19 October 2020Alt.: 2010 EL27 || 
|- id="2004 LG33" bgcolor=#fefefe
| 1 ||  || MBA-I || 18.8 || data-sort-value="0.52" | 520 m || multiple || 2001–2020 || 05 Nov 2020 || 76 || align=left | Disc.: SpacewatchAdded on 19 October 2020 || 
|}
back to top

M 

|- id="2004 MA" bgcolor=#FA8072
| 0 || 2004 MA || MCA || 19.07 || data-sort-value="0.46" | 460 m || multiple || 2004–2021 || 05 Dec 2021 || 98 || align=left | — || 
|- id="2004 MC" bgcolor=#FFC2E0
| 5 || 2004 MC || APO || 23.3 || data-sort-value="0.078" | 78 m || single || 15 days || 30 Jun 2004 || 131 || align=left | — || 
|- id="2004 MD" bgcolor=#FFC2E0
| 0 || 2004 MD || APO || 20.2 || data-sort-value="0.32" | 320 m || multiple || 2004–2020 || 14 Aug 2020 || 295 || align=left | Potentially hazardous object || 
|- id="2004 MJ1" bgcolor=#E9E9E9
| 0 ||  || MBA-M || 17.32 || 1.4 km || multiple || 2004–2021 || 28 Oct 2021 || 63 || align=left | Disc.: SpacewatchAdded on 30 September 2021 || 
|- id="2004 MN1" bgcolor=#FFC2E0
| 8 ||  || APO || 24.6 || data-sort-value="0.043" | 43 m || single || 1 day || 17 Jun 2004 || 7 || align=left | — || 
|- id="2004 MO1" bgcolor=#FFC2E0
| 9 ||  || AMO || 23.2 || data-sort-value="0.081" | 81 m || single || 2 days || 19 Jun 2004 || 22 || align=left | — || 
|- id="2004 MP1" bgcolor=#FFC2E0
| 7 ||  || APO || 25.2 || data-sort-value="0.032" | 32 m || single || 7 days || 24 Jun 2004 || 34 || align=left | — || 
|- id="2004 MR1" bgcolor=#FFC2E0
| 7 ||  || APO || 25.6 || data-sort-value="0.027" | 27 m || single || 1 day || 19 Jun 2004 || 38 || align=left | — || 
|- id="2004 MS1" bgcolor=#FFC2E0
| 6 ||  || APO || 22.3 || data-sort-value="0.12" | 120 m || single || 21 days || 09 Jul 2004 || 87 || align=left | — || 
|- id="2004 MV2" bgcolor=#FFC2E0
| 7 ||  || APO || 23.5 || data-sort-value="0.071" | 71 m || single || 4 days || 23 Jun 2004 || 22 || align=left | — || 
|- id="2004 MW2" bgcolor=#FFC2E0
| 3 ||  || APO || 19.3 || data-sort-value="0.49" | 490 m || multiple || 2004–2020 || 29 Jun 2020 || 170 || align=left | — || 
|- id="2004 MX2" bgcolor=#FFC2E0
| 0 ||  || APO || 19.30 || 1.3 km || multiple || 2004–2019 || 14 Jan 2019 || 97 || align=left | Potentially hazardous object || 
|- id="2004 MZ2" bgcolor=#fefefe
| 1 ||  || MBA-I || 17.6 || data-sort-value="0.90" | 900 m || multiple || 2004–2021 || 16 Jan 2021 || 29 || align=left | — || 
|- id="2004 MJ3" bgcolor=#d6d6d6
| 0 ||  || MBA-O || 15.68 || 4.1 km || multiple || 2004–2022 || 16 Jan 2022 || 311 || align=left | — || 
|- id="2004 MO3" bgcolor=#FFC2E0
| 2 ||  || APO || 22.2 || data-sort-value="0.13" | 130 m || multiple || 2004–2015 || 25 Aug 2015 || 134 || align=left | — || 
|- id="2004 MP3" bgcolor=#FFC2E0
| 0 ||  || AMO || 18.59 || data-sort-value="0.68" | 680 m || multiple || 2000–2021 || 11 Nov 2021 || 135 || align=left | — || 
|- id="2004 MO4" bgcolor=#FFC2E0
| 5 ||  || AMO || 24.9 || data-sort-value="0.037" | 37 m || single || 32 days || 24 Jul 2004 || 79 || align=left | — || 
|- id="2004 MA5" bgcolor=#E9E9E9
| – ||  || MBA-M || 17.5 || data-sort-value="0.94" | 940 m || single || 18 days || 29 Jun 2004 || 15 || align=left | — || 
|- id="2004 MB5" bgcolor=#FA8072
| – ||  || MCA || 17.2 || 1.1 km || single || 2 days || 24 Jun 2004 || 21 || align=left | — || 
|- id="2004 MK5" bgcolor=#fefefe
| 0 ||  || MBA-I || 18.13 || data-sort-value="0.70" | 700 m || multiple || 2004–2021 || 08 May 2021 || 66 || align=left | — || 
|- id="2004 MM5" bgcolor=#E9E9E9
| 0 ||  || MBA-M || 17.50 || 1.3 km || multiple || 2004–2021 || 26 Aug 2021 || 91 || align=left | Disc.: LPL/Spacewatch IIAdded on 17 June 2021 || 
|- id="2004 MW5" bgcolor=#E9E9E9
| 0 ||  || MBA-M || 16.7 || 2.5 km || multiple || 2004–2021 || 18 Jan 2021 || 78 || align=left | Alt.: 2013 KH17 || 
|- id="2004 MB6" bgcolor=#FFC2E0
| 0 ||  || APO || 19.6 || data-sort-value="0.43" | 430 m || multiple || 2004–2012 || 07 Jul 2012 || 62 || align=left | — || 
|- id="2004 ME6" bgcolor=#FFC2E0
| – ||  || APO || 22.6 || data-sort-value="0.11" | 110 m || single || 1 day || 26 Jun 2004 || 8 || align=left | AMO at MPC || 
|- id="2004 MJ6" bgcolor=#d6d6d6
| 0 ||  || MBA-O || 17.05 || 2.2 km || multiple || 2004–2021 || 04 Aug 2021 || 57 || align=left | Disc.: SpacewatchAdded on 24 December 2021 || 
|- id="2004 MQ6" bgcolor=#FFC2E0
| 3 ||  || APO || 19.7 || data-sort-value="0.41" | 410 m || multiple || 2004–2014 || 01 Jun 2014 || 128 || align=left | — || 
|- id="2004 MA7" bgcolor=#FA8072
| 0 ||  || MCA || 17.68 || 1.2 km || multiple || 2004–2021 || 08 Apr 2021 || 520 || align=left | — || 
|- id="2004 MP7" bgcolor=#FFC2E0
| 6 ||  || APO || 21.7 || data-sort-value="0.16" | 160 m || single || 26 days || 22 Jul 2004 || 62 || align=left | Potentially hazardous object || 
|- id="2004 MZ7" bgcolor=#FA8072
| 1 ||  || MCA || 17.8 || 1.5 km || multiple || 2004–2019 || 26 May 2019 || 232 || align=left | — || 
|- id="2004 MB8" bgcolor=#FA8072
| 0 ||  || MCA || 16.8 || 2.4 km || multiple || 2001–2019 || 28 Jan 2019 || 121 || align=left | — || 
|- id="2004 MS8" bgcolor=#C2E0FF
| 2 ||  || TNO || 8.3 || 103 km || multiple || 2004–2013 || 06 Oct 2013 || 18 || align=left | LoUTNOs, plutino || 
|- id="2004 MT8" bgcolor=#C2E0FF
| 3 ||  || TNO || 6.5 || 167 km || multiple || 2004–2015 || 12 Jun 2015 || 16 || align=left | LoUTNOs, cubewano (cold) || 
|- id="2004 MU8" bgcolor=#C2E0FF
| 4 ||  || TNO || 5.95 || 160 km || multiple || 2004–2021 || 09 Jul 2021 || 36 || align=left | LoUTNOs, cubewano (cold), binary: 143 km || 
|- id="2004 MV8" bgcolor=#C2E0FF
| 3 ||  || TNO || 6.88 || 152 km || multiple || 2004–2021 || 09 Aug 2021 || 18 || align=left | LoUTNOs, twotino? || 
|- id="2004 MW8" bgcolor=#C2E0FF
| 1 ||  || TNO || 8.6 || 106 km || multiple || 2004–2020 || 13 Sep 2020 || 127 || align=left | LoUTNOs, centaur || 
|- id="2004 MX8" bgcolor=#fefefe
| 0 ||  || HUN || 18.3 || data-sort-value="0.65" | 650 m || multiple || 2004–2020 || 24 May 2020 || 69 || align=left | — || 
|- id="2004 MY8" bgcolor=#E9E9E9
| 0 ||  || MBA-M || 17.2 || 2.0 km || multiple || 2004–2018 || 06 Oct 2018 || 72 || align=left | — || 
|- id="2004 MC9" bgcolor=#fefefe
| 0 ||  || HUN || 18.3 || data-sort-value="0.65" | 650 m || multiple || 2004–2020 || 19 May 2020 || 59 || align=left | — || 
|- id="2004 MD9" bgcolor=#d6d6d6
| 0 ||  || MBA-O || 17.0 || 2.2 km || multiple || 2004–2020 || 06 Dec 2020 || 98 || align=left | — || 
|- id="2004 ME9" bgcolor=#E9E9E9
| 0 ||  || MBA-M || 17.8 || 1.2 km || multiple || 2004–2017 || 23 Oct 2017 || 47 || align=left | — || 
|- id="2004 MF9" bgcolor=#d6d6d6
| 0 ||  || MBA-O || 16.4 || 2.9 km || multiple || 2004–2021 || 04 Oct 2021 || 84 || align=left | Alt.: 2010 KM124 || 
|- id="2004 MG9" bgcolor=#fefefe
| 0 ||  || MBA-I || 18.2 || data-sort-value="0.68" | 680 m || multiple || 2004–2019 || 23 Sep 2019 || 53 || align=left | — || 
|- id="2004 MH9" bgcolor=#E9E9E9
| 0 ||  || MBA-M || 17.7 || 1.2 km || multiple || 2004–2018 || 06 Oct 2018 || 56 || align=left | — || 
|- id="2004 MJ9" bgcolor=#d6d6d6
| 0 ||  || MBA-O || 16.87 || 2.4 km || multiple || 2004–2021 || 31 Oct 2021 || 130 || align=left | Alt.: 2010 JG71 || 
|- id="2004 MK9" bgcolor=#fefefe
| 0 ||  || MBA-I || 18.0 || data-sort-value="0.75" | 750 m || multiple || 2004–2018 || 12 Feb 2018 || 35 || align=left | — || 
|- id="2004 MM9" bgcolor=#E9E9E9
| 0 ||  || MBA-M || 17.9 || 1.1 km || multiple || 2004–2017 || 16 Aug 2017 || 33 || align=left | — || 
|- id="2004 MN9" bgcolor=#fefefe
| 0 ||  || MBA-I || 17.3 || 1.0 km || multiple || 2004–2020 || 17 Dec 2020 || 93 || align=left | — || 
|- id="2004 MP9" bgcolor=#d6d6d6
| 0 ||  || MBA-O || 15.67 || 4.1 km || multiple || 2004–2021 || 07 Nov 2021 || 89 || align=left | Alt.: 2010 LM15 || 
|- id="2004 MQ9" bgcolor=#E9E9E9
| 0 ||  || MBA-M || 16.7 || 1.9 km || multiple || 2003–2021 || 06 Jun 2021 || 107 || align=left | Alt.: 2008 NV || 
|- id="2004 MS9" bgcolor=#d6d6d6
| 0 ||  || MBA-O || 16.2 || 3.2 km || multiple || 2004–2020 || 19 May 2020 || 91 || align=left | — || 
|- id="2004 MU9" bgcolor=#fefefe
| 0 ||  || MBA-I || 17.8 || data-sort-value="0.82" | 820 m || multiple || 2004–2020 || 15 Dec 2020 || 59 || align=left | — || 
|- id="2004 MV9" bgcolor=#E9E9E9
| 1 ||  || MBA-M || 17.0 || 1.7 km || multiple || 2004–2014 || 24 Oct 2014 || 42 || align=left | — || 
|- id="2004 MW9" bgcolor=#E9E9E9
| 0 ||  || MBA-M || 17.3 || 1.5 km || multiple || 2004–2021 || 18 Mar 2021 || 45 || align=left | — || 
|- id="2004 MX9" bgcolor=#fefefe
| 1 ||  || MBA-I || 18.3 || data-sort-value="0.65" | 650 m || multiple || 2004–2019 || 24 Sep 2019 || 46 || align=left | — || 
|- id="2004 MY9" bgcolor=#fefefe
| 0 ||  || MBA-I || 18.2 || data-sort-value="0.68" | 680 m || multiple || 2004–2019 || 07 Jul 2019 || 34 || align=left | — || 
|- id="2004 MZ9" bgcolor=#fefefe
| 0 ||  || MBA-I || 17.3 || 1.0 km || multiple || 2004–2021 || 18 Jan 2021 || 115 || align=left | — || 
|- id="2004 MA10" bgcolor=#d6d6d6
| 0 ||  || MBA-O || 16.92 || 2.3 km || multiple || 1995–2022 || 26 Jan 2022 || 108 || align=left | — || 
|- id="2004 MD10" bgcolor=#d6d6d6
| 0 ||  || MBA-O || 16.64 || 2.6 km || multiple || 1993–2021 || 03 Oct 2021 || 134 || align=left | — || 
|- id="2004 ME10" bgcolor=#fefefe
| 0 ||  || MBA-I || 18.27 || data-sort-value="0.66" | 660 m || multiple || 2004–2021 || 06 Nov 2021 || 110 || align=left | — || 
|- id="2004 MF10" bgcolor=#E9E9E9
| 0 ||  || MBA-M || 17.4 || 1.8 km || multiple || 2004–2018 || 01 Oct 2018 || 50 || align=left | — || 
|- id="2004 MG10" bgcolor=#E9E9E9
| 0 ||  || MBA-M || 18.13 || data-sort-value="0.70" | 700 m || multiple || 2004–2021 || 02 Oct 2021 || 72 || align=left | — || 
|- id="2004 MH10" bgcolor=#E9E9E9
| 0 ||  || MBA-M || 17.2 || 1.5 km || multiple || 2004–2021 || 08 Jun 2021 || 73 || align=left | — || 
|- id="2004 MK10" bgcolor=#C2E0FF
| 9 ||  || TNO || 8.01 || 139 km || single || 51 days || 12 Aug 2004 || 8 || align=left | Disc.: Mauna Kea Obs.Added on 22 July 2020LoUTNOs, centaur || 
|- id="2004 ML10" bgcolor=#fefefe
| 0 ||  || MBA-I || 18.2 || data-sort-value="0.68" | 680 m || multiple || 2004–2019 || 27 Nov 2019 || 38 || align=left | Disc.: SpacewatchAdded on 22 July 2020 || 
|- id="2004 MM10" bgcolor=#C2E0FF
| 9 ||  || TNO || 7.21 || 201 km || single || 22 days || 15 Jul 2004 || 7 || align=left | Disc.: Mauna Kea Obs.Added on 22 July 2020LoUTNOs, centaur || 
|- id="2004 MN10" bgcolor=#C2E0FF
| 9 ||  || TNO || 8.02 || 104 km || single || 55 days || 10 Aug 2004 || 6 || align=left | Disc.: Mauna Kea Obs.Added on 22 July 2020LoUTNOs, other TNO || 
|- id="2004 MO10" bgcolor=#C2E0FF
| 9 ||  || TNO || 8.12 || 132 km || single || 51 days || 12 Aug 2004 || 6 || align=left | Disc.: Mauna Kea Obs.Added on 22 July 2020LoUTNOs, centaur || 
|- id="2004 MP10" bgcolor=#C2E0FF
| E ||  || TNO || 8.0 || 119 km || single || 47 days || 10 Aug 2004 || 5 || align=left | Disc.: Mauna Kea Obs.Added on 22 July 2020LoUTNOs, plutino? || 
|- id="2004 MQ10" bgcolor=#d6d6d6
| 0 ||  || MBA-O || 17.10 || 2.1 km || multiple || 2000–2021 || 03 Oct 2021 || 73 || align=left | Disc.: SpacewatchAdded on 13 September 2020 || 
|}
back to top

N 

|- id="2004 NL" bgcolor=#E9E9E9
| 0 || 2004 NL || MBA-M || 17.14 || 1.1 km || multiple || 2004–2021 || 27 Dec 2021 || 71 || align=left | — || 
|- id="2004 NG1" bgcolor=#E9E9E9
| 0 ||  || MBA-M || 18.11 || data-sort-value="0.71" | 710 m || multiple || 2004–2021 || 28 Nov 2021 || 53 || align=left | — || 
|- id="2004 NF3" bgcolor=#FFC2E0
| 6 ||  || AMO || 24.5 || data-sort-value="0.045" | 45 m || single || 11 days || 22 Jul 2004 || 38 || align=left | — || 
|- id="2004 NH7" bgcolor=#E9E9E9
| 0 ||  || MBA-M || 16.4 || 2.9 km || multiple || 2004–2021 || 17 Jan 2021 || 92 || align=left | — || 
|- id="2004 NT7" bgcolor=#FA8072
| 1 ||  || MCA || 18.0 || data-sort-value="0.75" | 750 m || multiple || 2004–2020 || 29 Jan 2020 || 48 || align=left | — || 
|- id="2004 NU7" bgcolor=#FFC2E0
| 8 ||  || APO || 24.4 || data-sort-value="0.047" | 47 m || single || 7 days || 21 Jul 2004 || 22 || align=left | AMO at MPC || 
|- id="2004 NK8" bgcolor=#FFC2E0
| 7 ||  || APO || 23.5 || data-sort-value="0.071" | 71 m || single || 28 days || 11 Aug 2004 || 27 || align=left | — || 
|- id="2004 NM8" bgcolor=#FFC2E0
| 1 ||  || AMO || 21.3 || data-sort-value="0.20" | 200 m || multiple || 2004–2016 || 28 Aug 2016 || 58 || align=left | — || 
|- id="2004 NN8" bgcolor=#C2E0FF
| – ||  || TNO || 15.3 || 5.0 km || multiple || 2004–2005 || 01 May 2005 || 82 || align=left | LoUTNOs, damocloid || 
|- id="2004 NR13" bgcolor=#E9E9E9
| 2 ||  || MBA-M || 17.7 || 1.2 km || multiple || 2004–2017 || 22 Oct 2017 || 34 || align=left | — || 
|- id="2004 NW16" bgcolor=#fefefe
| 0 ||  || MBA-I || 17.5 || data-sort-value="0.94" | 940 m || multiple || 2004–2020 || 21 Jan 2020 || 105 || align=left | Alt.: 2011 LP5 || 
|- id="2004 NZ17" bgcolor=#E9E9E9
| 0 ||  || MBA-M || 17.35 || 1.0 km || multiple || 2004–2021 || 01 Oct 2021 || 43 || align=left | Alt.: 2016 ER183 || 
|- id="2004 NJ18" bgcolor=#E9E9E9
| 0 ||  || MBA-M || 17.53 || 1.3 km || multiple || 2004–2021 || 04 Jul 2021 || 53 || align=left | Alt.: 2017 ML18 || 
|- id="2004 NS18" bgcolor=#fefefe
| 0 ||  || MBA-I || 18.12 || data-sort-value="0.71" | 710 m || multiple || 2004–2021 || 14 Apr 2021 || 57 || align=left | Alt.: 2008 UL61, 2015 VB90 || 
|- id="2004 NU18" bgcolor=#FA8072
| 0 ||  || MCA || 19.8 || data-sort-value="0.33" | 330 m || multiple || 2004–2018 || 15 Oct 2018 || 44 || align=left | —Added on 22 July 2020Alt.: 2012 GB12 || 
|- id="2004 NQ19" bgcolor=#E9E9E9
| 0 ||  || MBA-M || 17.64 || data-sort-value="0.88" | 880 m || multiple || 1992–2021 || 30 Nov 2021 || 143 || align=left | — || 
|- id="2004 NS19" bgcolor=#E9E9E9
| 0 ||  || MBA-M || 16.6 || 1.4 km || multiple || 2004–2022 || 04 Jan 2022 || 69 || align=left | Disc.: LINEARAdded on 29 January 2022 || 
|- id="2004 NV19" bgcolor=#FA8072
| 0 ||  || MCA || 17.64 || 1.2 km || multiple || 2000–2021 || 19 Nov 2021 || 246 || align=left | Alt.: 2000 SM360 || 
|- id="2004 NF20" bgcolor=#FA8072
| 1 ||  || MCA || 18.15 || data-sort-value="0.70" | 700 m || multiple || 2004–2021 || 08 May 2021 || 45 || align=left | — || 
|- id="2004 NO20" bgcolor=#E9E9E9
| 2 ||  || MBA-M || 17.9 || data-sort-value="0.78" | 780 m || multiple || 2000–2020 || 18 Jul 2020 || 75 || align=left | — || 
|- id="2004 NX20" bgcolor=#fefefe
| 1 ||  || MBA-I || 17.8 || data-sort-value="0.82" | 820 m || multiple || 2004–2019 || 07 Dec 2019 || 60 || align=left | Alt.: 2015 JV1 || 
|- id="2004 NO22" bgcolor=#E9E9E9
| 0 ||  || MBA-M || 16.86 || 2.4 km || multiple || 2004–2021 || 07 Apr 2021 || 88 || align=left | Alt.: 2016 AG32 || 
|- id="2004 NB26" bgcolor=#E9E9E9
| 0 ||  || MBA-M || 16.92 || 1.2 km || multiple || 2004–2022 || 21 Jan 2022 || 187 || align=left | Alt.: 2004 OU15, 2009 WR160 || 
|- id="2004 NH26" bgcolor=#E9E9E9
| 1 ||  || MBA-M || 17.2 || 1.1 km || multiple || 2000–2020 || 19 Aug 2020 || 63 || align=left | — || 
|- id="2004 ND27" bgcolor=#fefefe
| 1 ||  || MBA-I || 17.7 || data-sort-value="0.86" | 860 m || multiple || 2004–2021 || 07 Feb 2021 || 32 || align=left | Disc.: LINEARAdded on 11 May 2021Alt.: 2014 DQ16 || 
|- id="2004 NM27" bgcolor=#E9E9E9
| 1 ||  || MBA-M || 17.3 || 1.5 km || multiple || 2004–2020 || 23 Jan 2020 || 55 || align=left | — || 
|- id="2004 NN28" bgcolor=#E9E9E9
| 2 ||  || MBA-M || 17.6 || data-sort-value="0.90" | 900 m || multiple || 2004–2020 || 21 Jul 2020 || 61 || align=left | — || 
|- id="2004 ND29" bgcolor=#E9E9E9
| 0 ||  || MBA-M || 17.1 || 1.6 km || multiple || 2004–2021 || 06 Jun 2021 || 145 || align=left | — || 
|- id="2004 NF29" bgcolor=#fefefe
| 0 ||  || MBA-I || 17.70 || data-sort-value="0.86" | 860 m || multiple || 2004–2019 || 21 Oct 2019 || 65 || align=left | — || 
|- id="2004 NM30" bgcolor=#E9E9E9
| 0 ||  || MBA-M || 18.42 || data-sort-value="0.62" | 620 m || multiple || 2004–2021 || 31 Oct 2021 || 44 || align=left | — || 
|- id="2004 NN31" bgcolor=#FA8072
| 0 ||  || MCA || 19.65 || data-sort-value="0.35" | 350 m || multiple || 2004–2019 || 29 Oct 2019 || 87 || align=left | — || 
|- id="2004 NW31" bgcolor=#fefefe
| 1 ||  || MBA-I || 18.2 || data-sort-value="0.68" | 680 m || multiple || 2004–2018 || 21 May 2018 || 46 || align=left | Alt.: 2011 LT13, 2015 TT38 || 
|- id="2004 NA32" bgcolor=#E9E9E9
| 1 ||  || MBA-M || 16.9 || 1.2 km || multiple || 2004–2020 || 21 Jun 2020 || 65 || align=left | Alt.: 2005 YW103 || 
|- id="2004 NF32" bgcolor=#d6d6d6
| 0 ||  || MBA-O || 16.9 || 2.3 km || multiple || 1998–2020 || 16 May 2020 || 62 || align=left | Alt.: 2014 BZ36 || 
|- id="2004 NU33" bgcolor=#FA8072
| 0 ||  || MCA || 19.05 || data-sort-value="0.46" | 460 m || multiple || 2004–2021 || 11 May 2021 || 56 || align=left | — || 
|- id="2004 NA34" bgcolor=#fefefe
| 0 ||  || MBA-I || 17.6 || data-sort-value="0.90" | 900 m || multiple || 1993–2019 || 27 Oct 2019 || 106 || align=left | — || 
|- id="2004 NB34" bgcolor=#fefefe
| 1 ||  || HUN || 17.8 || data-sort-value="0.82" | 820 m || multiple || 2004–2020 || 13 Nov 2020 || 183 || align=left | — || 
|- id="2004 NC34" bgcolor=#fefefe
| 0 ||  || MBA-I || 17.5 || data-sort-value="0.94" | 940 m || multiple || 2004–2021 || 04 Jan 2021 || 99 || align=left | — || 
|- id="2004 ND34" bgcolor=#E9E9E9
| 0 ||  || MBA-M || 17.63 || data-sort-value="0.89" | 890 m || multiple || 2004–2021 || 30 Aug 2021 || 48 || align=left | — || 
|- id="2004 NE34" bgcolor=#E9E9E9
| 0 ||  || MBA-M || 18.11 || 1.0 km || multiple || 2004–2021 || 13 May 2021 || 58 || align=left | — || 
|- id="2004 NF34" bgcolor=#E9E9E9
| 0 ||  || MBA-M || 17.44 || 1.8 km || multiple || 2004–2022 || 24 Jan 2022 || 49 || align=left | — || 
|- id="2004 NG34" bgcolor=#E9E9E9
| 0 ||  || MBA-M || 17.50 || 1.8 km || multiple || 2004–2021 || 15 Apr 2021 || 64 || align=left | — || 
|- id="2004 NH34" bgcolor=#E9E9E9
| 0 ||  || MBA-M || 17.25 || 1.1 km || multiple || 2004–2021 || 30 Nov 2021 || 104 || align=left | — || 
|- id="2004 NJ34" bgcolor=#E9E9E9
| 0 ||  || MBA-M || 17.18 || 2.0 km || multiple || 2004–2021 || 15 Apr 2021 || 54 || align=left | — || 
|- id="2004 NK34" bgcolor=#fefefe
| 1 ||  || HUN || 18.1 || data-sort-value="0.71" | 710 m || multiple || 2004–2021 || 09 Jan 2021 || 77 || align=left | — || 
|- id="2004 NL34" bgcolor=#fefefe
| 0 ||  || MBA-I || 18.66 || data-sort-value="0.55" | 550 m || multiple || 2004–2021 || 02 May 2021 || 66 || align=left | — || 
|- id="2004 NM34" bgcolor=#d6d6d6
| 0 ||  || MBA-O || 16.4 || 2.9 km || multiple || 2004–2021 || 06 Jan 2021 || 76 || align=left | — || 
|- id="2004 NN34" bgcolor=#E9E9E9
| 0 ||  || MBA-M || 17.2 || 1.5 km || multiple || 2004–2021 || 07 Jun 2021 || 75 || align=left | Disc.: LONEOSAdded on 22 July 2020 || 
|- id="2004 NO34" bgcolor=#E9E9E9
| 0 ||  || MBA-M || 17.29 || 1.0 km || multiple || 2004–2022 || 06 Jan 2022 || 158 || align=left | Disc.: SSSAdded on 13 September 2020 || 
|- id="2004 NP34" bgcolor=#E9E9E9
| 0 ||  || MBA-M || 16.72 || 1.3 km || multiple || 2003–2021 || 28 Nov 2021 || 71 || align=left | Disc.: SSSAdded on 24 December 2021 || 
|}
back to top

O 

|- id="2004 ON1" bgcolor=#E9E9E9
| 0 ||  || MBA-M || 17.3 || 1.5 km || multiple || 2004–2021 || 15 Jun 2021 || 91 || align=left | — || 
|- id="2004 OX1" bgcolor=#E9E9E9
| 0 ||  || MBA-M || 17.56 || data-sort-value="0.91" | 910 m || multiple || 2004–2020 || 07 Dec 2020 || 30 || align=left | — || 
|- id="2004 OD4" bgcolor=#FFC2E0
| 6 ||  || APO || 27.0 || data-sort-value="0.014" | 14 m || single || 4 days || 21 Jul 2004 || 33 || align=left | — || 
|- id="2004 OF6" bgcolor=#FFC2E0
| 2 ||  || AMO || 21.2 || data-sort-value="0.20" | 200 m || multiple || 2004–2017 || 11 Nov 2017 || 50 || align=left | — || 
|- id="2004 ON6" bgcolor=#E9E9E9
| 0 ||  || MBA-M || 17.4 || 1.4 km || multiple || 2004–2021 || 07 Jun 2021 || 54 || align=left | — || 
|- id="2004 OR6" bgcolor=#E9E9E9
| 1 ||  || MBA-M || 17.5 || 1.3 km || multiple || 2004–2021 || 30 Oct 2021 || 36 || align=left | Disc.: LINEARAdded on 29 January 2022 || 
|- id="2004 OE7" bgcolor=#fefefe
| 0 ||  || MBA-I || 17.2 || 1.1 km || multiple || 2004–2021 || 04 Jan 2021 || 87 || align=left | Alt.: 2012 VS62, 2015 KM93 || 
|- id="2004 OF7" bgcolor=#E9E9E9
| 0 ||  || MBA-M || 17.32 || 1.0 km || multiple || 2004–2021 || 08 Dec 2021 || 107 || align=left | — || 
|- id="2004 OO8" bgcolor=#d6d6d6
| 0 ||  || MBA-O || 17.4 || 1.8 km || multiple || 2004–2019 || 28 Dec 2019 || 66 || align=left | — || 
|- id="2004 OP10" bgcolor=#FA8072
| 0 ||  || MCA || 17.73 || 1.2 km || multiple || 2004–2021 || 27 Sep 2021 || 145 || align=left | — || 
|- id="2004 OW10" bgcolor=#FFC2E0
| 1 ||  || APO || 24.74 || data-sort-value="0.045" | 45 m || multiple || 2004-2023 || 11 Feb 2023 || 45 || align=left | — || 
|- id="2004 OL12" bgcolor=#C2E0FF
| E ||  || TNO || 6.1 || 200 km || single || 64 days || 18 Sep 2004 || 7 || align=left | LoUTNOs, cubewano (cold) || 
|- id="2004 OF13" bgcolor=#E9E9E9
| 1 ||  || MBA-M || 18.53 || 900 m || multiple || 2004-2023 || 21 Jan 2023 || 45 || align=left | Alt.: 2022 QF231 || 
|- id="2004 OL13" bgcolor=#E9E9E9
| 0 ||  || MBA-M || 17.2 || 1.5 km || multiple || 2004–2020 || 27 Apr 2020 || 59 || align=left | — || 
|- id="2004 OW13" bgcolor=#E9E9E9
| 0 ||  || MBA-M || 17.14 || 2.1 km || multiple || 2004–2021 || 03 May 2021 || 89 || align=left | Alt.: 2016 CM58 || 
|- id="2004 OA14" bgcolor=#fefefe
| 1 ||  || MBA-I || 18.5 || data-sort-value="0.59" | 590 m || multiple || 2004–2019 || 29 Oct 2019 || 46 || align=left | Alt.: 2015 PS243 || 
|- id="2004 OJ14" bgcolor=#C2E0FF
| 3 ||  || TNO || 6.4 || 218 km || multiple || 2004–2007 || 11 Jul 2007 || 13 || align=left | LoUTNOs, other TNO, BR-mag: 1.42; taxonomy: IR || 
|- id="2004 OL14" bgcolor=#C2E0FF
| 6 ||  || TNO || 8.09 || 91 km || multiple || 2004–2005 || 09 Aug 2005 || 11 || align=left | LoUTNOs, SDO || 
|- id="2004 OG15" bgcolor=#d6d6d6
| 0 ||  || MBA-O || 17.1 || 2.1 km || multiple || 2004–2020 || 13 Nov 2020 || 96 || align=left | — || 
|- id="2004 OP15" bgcolor=#C2E0FF
| 3 ||  || TNO || 6.9 || 173 km || multiple || 2004–2017 || 04 Jul 2017 || 18 || align=left | LoUTNOs, other TNO || 
|- id="2004 OQ15" bgcolor=#C2E0FF
| 4 ||  || TNO || 6.64 || 170 km || multiple || 2004–2021 || 09 Jul 2021 || 31 || align=left | LoUTNOs, res4:7, BR-mag: 1.36; taxonomy: BR-IR || 
|- id="2004 OS15" bgcolor=#C2E0FF
| 2 ||  || TNO || 7.2 || 137 km || multiple || 2004–2019 || 04 Sep 2019 || 21 || align=left | LoUTNOs, SDO || 
|- id="2004 OX15" bgcolor=#E9E9E9
| 0 ||  || MBA-M || 17.05 || 1.6 km || multiple || 2004–2021 || 30 Aug 2021 || 178 || align=left | — || 
|- id="2004 OY15" bgcolor=#E9E9E9
| 0 ||  || MBA-M || 17.55 || 1.3 km || multiple || 2000–2021 || 01 Sep 2021 || 76 || align=left | — || 
|- id="2004 OB16" bgcolor=#fefefe
| 0 ||  || MBA-I || 17.96 || data-sort-value="0.76" | 760 m || multiple || 2004–2021 || 08 Nov 2021 || 143 || align=left | — || 
|- id="2004 OC16" bgcolor=#fefefe
| 1 ||  || MBA-I || 18.4 || data-sort-value="0.62" | 620 m || multiple || 2004–2019 || 10 Mar 2019 || 41 || align=left | — || 
|- id="2004 OE16" bgcolor=#d6d6d6
| 0 ||  || MBA-O || 17.30 || 1.9 km || multiple || 2001–2021 || 17 May 2021 || 39 || align=left | — || 
|- id="2004 OF16" bgcolor=#d6d6d6
| 0 ||  || MBA-O || 16.70 || 2.5 km || multiple || 2004–2021 || 13 May 2021 || 47 || align=left | Alt.: 2010 HX124 || 
|- id="2004 OG16" bgcolor=#fefefe
| 1 ||  || MBA-I || 18.7 || data-sort-value="0.54" | 540 m || multiple || 2004–2018 || 19 Mar 2018 || 29 || align=left | — || 
|- id="2004 OH16" bgcolor=#fefefe
| 0 ||  || MBA-I || 19.4 || data-sort-value="0.39" | 390 m || multiple || 2004–2020 || 10 Aug 2020 || 31 || align=left | — || 
|- id="2004 OK16" bgcolor=#fefefe
| 0 ||  || HUN || 18.77 || data-sort-value="0.52" | 520 m || multiple || 2005–2021 || 03 Dec 2021 || 78 || align=left | — || 
|- id="2004 OL16" bgcolor=#fefefe
| 3 ||  || MBA-I || 19.6 || data-sort-value="0.36" | 360 m || multiple || 2004–2014 || 25 Oct 2014 || 25 || align=left | — || 
|- id="2004 OM16" bgcolor=#fefefe
| 1 ||  || MBA-I || 19.43 || data-sort-value="0.39" | 390 m || multiple || 2004–2021 || 30 Oct 2021 || 21 || align=left | — || 
|- id="2004 ON16" bgcolor=#E9E9E9
| 0 ||  || MBA-M || 16.97 || 2.2 km || multiple || 1999–2021 || 12 May 2021 || 142 || align=left | — || 
|- id="2004 OO16" bgcolor=#fefefe
| 0 ||  || MBA-I || 18.0 || data-sort-value="0.75" | 750 m || multiple || 2004–2019 || 27 Oct 2019 || 68 || align=left | — || 
|- id="2004 OQ16" bgcolor=#E9E9E9
| 0 ||  || MBA-M || 16.9 || 2.3 km || multiple || 2004–2019 || 19 Nov 2019 || 53 || align=left | — || 
|- id="2004 OR16" bgcolor=#fefefe
| 0 ||  || HUN || 18.54 || data-sort-value="0.58" | 580 m || multiple || 2004–2022 || 24 Jan 2022 || 60 || align=left | — || 
|- id="2004 OS16" bgcolor=#fefefe
| 0 ||  || MBA-I || 18.77 || data-sort-value="0.52" | 520 m || multiple || 2004–2021 || 08 May 2021 || 56 || align=left | — || 
|- id="2004 OT16" bgcolor=#fefefe
| 1 ||  || MBA-I || 18.5 || data-sort-value="0.59" | 590 m || multiple || 1999–2018 || 10 Aug 2018 || 47 || align=left | — || 
|- id="2004 OU16" bgcolor=#fefefe
| 0 ||  || MBA-I || 19.02 || data-sort-value="0.47" | 470 m || multiple || 2004–2021 || 09 May 2021 || 85 || align=left | — || 
|- id="2004 OV16" bgcolor=#E9E9E9
| 0 ||  || MBA-M || 17.4 || 1.4 km || multiple || 2004–2021 || 07 Jun 2021 || 45 || align=left | — || 
|- id="2004 OW16" bgcolor=#d6d6d6
| 0 ||  || MBA-O || 16.18 || 3.2 km || multiple || 2004–2021 || 02 Dec 2021 || 131 || align=left | Alt.: 2010 OT67 || 
|- id="2004 OX16" bgcolor=#fefefe
| 0 ||  || MBA-I || 18.7 || data-sort-value="0.54" | 540 m || multiple || 2004–2019 || 31 Dec 2019 || 53 || align=left | — || 
|- id="2004 OY16" bgcolor=#d6d6d6
| 2 ||  || MBA-O || 17.6 || 1.7 km || multiple || 2004–2019 || 03 Oct 2019 || 39 || align=left | — || 
|- id="2004 OZ16" bgcolor=#d6d6d6
| 0 ||  || MBA-O || 16.88 || 2.3 km || multiple || 2004–2021 || 13 Dec 2021 || 84 || align=left | Alt.: 2010 PT36 || 
|- id="2004 OC17" bgcolor=#E9E9E9
| 0 ||  || MBA-M || 17.5 || 1.8 km || multiple || 2004–2020 || 26 Feb 2020 || 57 || align=left | — || 
|- id="2004 OD17" bgcolor=#E9E9E9
| 0 ||  || MBA-M || 17.69 || 1.2 km || multiple || 2000–2021 || 03 Dec 2021 || 152 || align=left | —Added on 22 July 2020 || 
|- id="2004 OE17" bgcolor=#d6d6d6
| 0 ||  || MBA-O || 17.4 || 1.8 km || multiple || 2004–2021 || 14 Jan 2021 || 42 || align=left | —Added on 22 July 2020 || 
|- id="2004 OF17" bgcolor=#E9E9E9
| 0 ||  || MBA-M || 17.62 || data-sort-value="0.89" | 890 m || multiple || 2000–2021 || 28 Nov 2021 || 58 || align=left | —Added on 22 July 2020 || 
|- id="2004 OK17" bgcolor=#E9E9E9
| 0 ||  || MBA-M || 16.87 || 2.4 km || multiple || 2004–2021 || 06 May 2021 || 74 || align=left | Disc.: SSSAdded on 19 October 2020 || 
|- id="2004 OL17" bgcolor=#d6d6d6
| 0 ||  || MBA-O || 16.21 || 3.2 km || multiple || 2004–2021 || 01 Nov 2021 || 175 || align=left | Disc.: SSSAdded on 19 October 2020Alt.: 2010 MV80, 2015 OK22 || 
|- id="2004 OM17" bgcolor=#d6d6d6
| 1 ||  || MBA-O || 17.3 || 1.9 km || multiple || 2004–2020 || 18 Sep 2020 || 30 || align=left | Disc.: Cerro TololoAdded on 17 January 2021 || 
|- id="2004 ON17" bgcolor=#E9E9E9
| 0 ||  || MBA-M || 18.17 || data-sort-value="0.98" | 980 m || multiple || 2004–2021 || 07 Sep 2021 || 53 || align=left | Disc.: Cerro TololoAdded on 9 March 2021 || 
|- id="2004 OP17" bgcolor=#fefefe
| 0 ||  || MBA-I || 18.1 || data-sort-value="0.71" | 710 m || multiple || 2004–2021 || 14 May 2021 || 50 || align=left | Disc.: Cerro TololoAdded on 17 June 2021 || 
|- id="2004 OQ17" bgcolor=#d6d6d6
| 4 ||  || MBA-O || 17.8 || 1.5 km || multiple || 2004–2019 || 23 Oct 2019 || 19 || align=left | Disc.: Cerro TololoAdded on 17 June 2021 || 
|- id="2004 OR17" bgcolor=#d6d6d6
| 0 ||  || MBA-O || 17.80 || 1.5 km || multiple || 1999–2021 || 09 Nov 2021 || 61 || align=left | Disc.: Cerro TololoAdded on 5 November 2021 || 
|- id="2004 OS17" bgcolor=#E9E9E9
| 1 ||  || MBA-M || 17.87 || data-sort-value="0.79" | 790 m || multiple || 2004–2022 || 04 Jan 2022 || 25 || align=left | Disc.: Cerro TololoAdded on 24 December 2021 || 
|}
back to top

References 
 

Lists of unnumbered minor planets